= List of Breeders' Cup broadcasters =

The following is a list of national American television networks and announcers that have broadcast the Breeders' Cup.

== Television ==
=== 2020s ===
Year	Network	Race callers	Hosts	Analysts	Handicappers	Reporters
2026	NBC; USA	Larry Collmus	Ahmed Fareed and Britney Eurton	Randy Moss and Jerry Bailey	Eddie Olczyk and Matt Bernier	Kenny Rice, Nick Luck, Andie Biancone and Steve Kornacki
2025	NBC; USA	Larry Collmus	Ahmed Fareed and Britney Eurton	Randy Moss and Jerry Bailey	Eddie Olczyk and Matt Bernier	Kenny Rice, Donna Barton Brothers, Nick Luck and Steve Kornacki
2024	NBC; USA	Larry Collmus	Ahmed Fareed and Britney Eurton	Randy Moss and Jerry Bailey	Eddie Olczyk	Kenny Rice, Donna Barton Brothers, and Nick Luck
2023	NBC; USA	Larry Collmus	Ahmed Fareed	Randy Moss and Jerry Bailey	Eddie Olczyk and Matt Bernier	Kenny Rice, Donna Barton Brothers, Britney Eurton, Nick Luck and Steve Kornacki
2022	NBC; USA	Larry Collmus	Ahmed Fareed	Randy Moss and Jerry Bailey	Eddie Olczyk and Matt Bernier	Kenny Rice, Donna Barton Brothers, Britney Eurton, Nick Luck and Steve Kornacki
2021	NBC; NBCSN	Larry Collmus	Ahmed Fareed and Maria Taylor	Randy Moss and Jerry Bailey	Eddie Olczyk and Matt Bernier	Kenny Rice, Donna Barton Brothers, Laffit Pincay, III, Britney Eurton, Nick Luck and Steve Kornacki
2020	NBC; NBCSN	Larry Collmus	Ahmed Fareed	Randy Moss and Jerry Bailey	Eddie Olczyk and Matt Bernier	Kenny Rice, Donna Barton Brothers, Laffit Pincay, III, Britney Eurton and Nick Luck

=== 2010s ===
Year	Network	Race callers	Hosts	Analysts	Handicappers	Reporters
2019	NBC; NBCSN	Larry Collmus	Ahmed Fareed	Randy Moss and Jerry Bailey	Eddie Olczyk and Matt Bernier	Kenny Rice, Donna Barton Brothers, Laffit Pincay, III, Britney Eurton and Nick Luck
2018	NBC; NBCSN	Larry Collmus	Mike Tirico	Randy Moss and Jerry Bailey	Eddie Olczyk and Matt Bernier	Kenny Rice, Donna Barton Brothers, Laffit Pincay, III, Britney Eurton and Nick Luck
2017	NBC; NBCSN	Larry Collmus	Bob Costas	Randy Moss and Jerry Bailey	Matt Bernier	Kenny Rice, Donna Barton Brothers, Laffit Pincay, III, Jay Privman, Britney Eurton and Nick Luck
2016	NBC; NBCSN	Larry Collmus	Tom Hammond and Mike Tirico	Randy Moss and Jerry Bailey	Bob Neumeier and Eddie Olczyk	Kenny Rice, Donna Barton Brothers, Laffit Pincay, III, Jay Privman, Carolyn Manno and Nick Luck
2015	NBC; NBCSN	Larry Collmus	Tom Hammond	Randy Moss and Jerry Bailey	Bob Neumeier and Eddie Olczyk	Kenny Rice, Donna Barton Brothers, Laffit Pincay, III, Jay Privman, Carolyn Manno and Nick Luck
2014	NBC; NBCSN	Larry Collmus	Tom Hammond	Randy Moss and Jerry Bailey	Eddie Olczyk	Kenny Rice, Donna Barton Brothers, Laffit Pincay, III, Jay Privman, Carolyn Manno, Josh Elliott and Nick Luck
2013	NBC; NBCSN	Larry Collmus	Tom Hammond	Randy Moss and Jerry Bailey	Bob Neumeier and Mike Battaglia	Kenny Rice, Donna Barton Brothers, Laffit Pincay, III, Jay Privman and Nick Luck
2012	NBC; NBCSN	Larry Collmus Trevor Denman	Tom Hammond	Gary Stevens, Randy Moss, and Jerry Bailey	Bob Neumeier and Mike Battaglia	Kenny Rice, Donna Barton Brothers, Laffit Pincay, III and Jay Privman
2011	ABC ESPN; ESPN2	Trevor Denman	Joe Tessitore and Kenny Mayne	Randy Moss, Jerry Bailey and Nick Luck	Hank Goldberg	Jeannine Edwards, Jay Privman, Caton Bredar and Bill Nack
2010	ABC ESPN; ESPN2	Trevor Denman	Joe Tessitore and Kenny Mayne	Randy Moss, Jerry Bailey and Nick Luck	Hank Goldberg	Jeannine Edwards, Jay Privman, Steve Cyphers, Jeremy Schaap, Bill Nack, and Caton Bredar

=== 2000s ===
Year	Network	Race caller	Hosts	Analysts	Handicappers	Reporters
2009	ABC ESPN; ESPN2	Trevor Denman	Joe Tessitore	Randy Moss, Jerry Bailey and Nick Luck	Hank Goldberg	Jeannine Edwards, Tom Rinaldi, Jay Privman, Chris Connelly, Bill Nack, Rick Reilly, and Caton Bredar
2008	ABC ESPN; ESPN2	Trevor Denman	Joe Tessitore and Kenny Mayne	Randy Moss, Jerry Bailey and Nick Luck	Hank Goldberg and Jessica Pacheco	Jeannine Edwards, Tom Rinaldi, Jay Privman, Bill Nack, and Caton Bredar
2007	ESPN	Trevor Denman	Joe Tessitore and Kenny Mayne	Randy Moss and Jerry Bailey	Hank Goldberg	Jeannine Edwards, Nick Luck, Laffit Pincay, III, Tom Rinaldi, and Caton Bredar
2006	ESPN	Trevor Denman	Chris Fowler and Kenny Mayne	Randy Moss and Jerry Bailey	Hank Goldberg	Jeannine Edwards, Joe Tessitore, Nick Luck and Patti Cooksey
2005	NBC	Tom Durkin	Tom Hammond and Bob Costas	Charlsie Cantey	Bob Neumeier, Trevor Denman, and Mike Battaglia	Bob Neumeier, Trevor Denman, Mike Battaglia, Kenny Rice, and Donna Barton Brothers
2004	NBC	Tom Durkin	Tom Hammond and Bob Costas	Charlsie Cantey	Bob Neumeier, Trevor Denman, and Mike Battaglia	Bob Neumeier, Trevor Denman, Mike Battaglia, Kenny Rice, and Donna Barton Brothers
2003	NBC	Tom Durkin	Tom Hammond and Bob Costas	Charlsie Cantey	Bob Neumeier, Trevor Denman, and Mike Battaglia	Bob Neumeier, Trevor Denman, Mike Battaglia, Kenny Rice, and Donna Barton Brothers
2002	NBC	Tom Durkin	Bob Costas	Charlsie Cantey	Bob Neumeier, Trevor Denman, and Mike Battaglia	Bob Neumeier, Trevor Denman, Mike Battaglia, Kenny Rice, and Donna Barton Brothers
2001	NBC	Tom Durkin	Tom Hammond	Charlsie Cantey	Bob Neumeier, Trevor Denman, and Mike Battaglia	Bob Neumeier, Trevor Denman, Mike Battaglia, Kenny Rice, and Donna Barton Brothers
2000	NBC	Tom Durkin	Tom Hammond	Charlsie Cantey	Bob Neumeier, Trevor Denman, and Mike Battaglia	Bob Neumeier, Trevor Denman, Mike Battaglia, and Kenny Rice, and Donna Barton Brothers

=== 1990s ===
Year	Network	Race caller	Hosts	Analysts	Handicappers	Reporters
1999	NBC	Tom Durkin	Tom Hammond	Gregg McCarron	Bob Neumeier, Trevor Denman, and Mike Battaglia	Bob Neumeier, Trevor Denman, Mike Battaglia, and Kenny Rice
1998	NBC	Tom Durkin	Tom Hammond	Gregg McCarron and Mike E. Smith	Bob Neumeier, Trevor Denman, and Mike Battaglia	Bob Neumeier, Trevor Denman, and Mike Battaglia
1997	NBC	Tom Durkin	Tom Hammond	John M. Veitch and Gregg McCarron	Bob Neumeier, Trevor Denman, and Mike Battaglia	Bob Neumeier, Trevor Denman, and Mike Battaglia
1996	NBC	Tom Durkin	Tom Hammond	John M. Veitch and Gregg McCarron	Bob Neumeier, Trevor Denman, and Mike Battaglia	Bob Neumeier, Trevor Denman, and Mike Battaglia
1995	NBC	Tom Durkin	Tom Hammond	John M. Veitch and Gregg McCarron	Bob Neumeier, Trevor Denman, and Mike Battaglia	Bob Neumeier, Trevor Denman, and Mike Battaglia
1994	NBC	Tom Durkin	Tom Hammond	John M. Veitch and Gregg McCarron	Bob Neumeier, Trevor Denman, and Mike Battaglia	Bob Neumeier, Trevor Denman, Mike Battaglia, Mary Ann Grabavoy, and Elfi Schlegel
1993	NBC	Tom Durkin	Tom Hammond	John M. Veitch and Gregg McCarron	Bob Neumeier, Trevor Denman, and Mike Battaglia	Bob Neumeier, Trevor Denman, Mike Battaglia, and Terry Leibel
1992	NBC	Tom Durkin	Tom Hammond	John M. Veitch and Gregg McCarron	Dan Kenny, Jenny Ornsteen, Bob Neumeier, and Trevor Denman	Jenny Ornsteen, Bob Neumeier, Trevor Denman, Gayle Gardner, and Terry Leibel
1991	NBC	Tom Durkin	Tom Hammond	John M. Veitch	Dan Kenny, Jenny Ornsteen, Bob Neumeier, and Trevor Denman	Jenny Ornsteen, Bob Neumeier, Trevor Denman, and Gregg McCarron
1990	NBC	Tom Durkin	Dick Enberg and Tom Hammond	John M. Veitch and Gregg McCarron	Jenny Ornsteen, Bob Neumeier, and Trevor Denman	Jenny Ornsteen, Bob Neumeier, and Trevor Denman

=== 1980s ===
Year	Network	Race caller	Hosts	Analysts	Reporters
1989	NBC	Tom Durkin	Dick Enberg and Tom Hammond	Jack Van Berg and Gregg McCarron	Sharon Smith, Jenny Ornsteen, and Trevor Denman
1988	NBC	Tom Durkin	Dick Enberg and Tom Hammond	Harvey Pack and Brough Scott	Sharon Smith, Jay Randolph, and Greg Lewis
1987	NBC	Tom Durkin	Dick Enberg and Tom Hammond	Harvey Pack, Brough Scott, and Gary Stevens	Sharon Smith and Jay Randolph
1986	NBC	Tom Durkin	Dick Enberg and Dave Johnson	Harvey Pack, Brough Scott, and Chris McCarron	Sharon Smith, Tom Hammond, and Jay Randolph
1985	NBC	Tom Durkin	Dick Enberg and Dave Johnson	Pete Axthelm, Brough Scott and Harvey Pack	Sharon Smith and Tom Hammond
1984	NBC	Tom Durkin	Dick Enberg and Dave Johnson	Pete Axthelm, Brough Scott, Michael O'Hehir and Harvey Pack	Sharon Smith, and Tom Hammond
