= List of Thoroughbred Racing on ESPN commentators =

Commentators on ESPN's thoroughbred racing coverage served as race callers, hosts, analysts, and reporters, with the tenures listed below spanning 1980 to 2011. Several commentators served in more than one of these roles.

== List ==
=== Race callers ===
- Trevor Denman (2006–2011)
- Tom Durkin (1987–2000)
- Dave Johnson (1981–2005)

=== Hosts ===
- Jay Crawford (2004)
- Rece Davis (2003–2009)
- Tom Durkin (1987–2000)
- Chris Fowler (1998–2007)
- Terry Gannon (2005–2007)
- Jay Harris (2006)
- Todd Harris (2006)
- Dave Johnson (1981–2005)
- Jim Kelly (2001)
- Suzy Kolber (2001–2003)
- Kenny Mayne (1999–2011)
- Brent Musburger (2004–2008)
- Kenny Rice (1997–2006)
- Joe Tessitore (2006–2011)
- Chris Lincoln (1985–2007)
- Bob Neumeier (1993–1998)
- Jeff Medders (2000–2006, 2008)
- Bill Seward (1984, 1996–2000)
- Rob Stone (2007)
- Sandra Neil Wallace (1991–2000)

=== Analysts ===
- Thea Andrews (2004–2006)
- Pete Axthelm (1985–1991)
- Jerry D. Bailey (2006–2011)
- Caton Bredar (1992–1998, 2007–2011)
- Charlsie Cantey (1985–2002)
- Catherine Crier (2004)
- Tom Dawson (1987)
- Tom Durkin (1987–2000)
- Jeannine Edwards (1995–2011)
- Dave Johnson (1981–2005)
- Alan Kirschenbaum (1986)
- Hank Goldberg (1997–2011)
- Kurt Hoover (2004–2005)
- Dan Issel (1991)
- Nick Luck (2006–2011)
- Chris McCarron (2002–2003)
- Randy Moss (1999–2011)
- Bob Neumeier (1993–1998)
- Jessica Pacheco (2008)
- Jay Privman (2002–2011)
- Rick Reilly (2008–2011)
- Mary Ellen Sarama (1986)
- Tommy Smyth (2005)
- Lesley Visser (1994–2000)
- Jack Whitaker (1996–2001)

=== Reporters ===
- Thea Andrews (2004–2006)
- Caton Bredar (1992–1998, 2007–2011)
- Jennifer Burke (2002–2003)
- Charlsie Cantey (1985–2002)
- Patricia Cooksey (2006)
- Catherine Crier (2004)
- Rece Davis (2007–2009)
- Jeannine Edwards (1995–2011)
- Pat Forde (2008)
- Kurt Hoover (2004–2005)
- Sharlene Wells Hawkes (1987–2003)
- Quint Kessenich (2003–2007)
- Jeff Medders (2000)
- Eleanor Mondale (2002–2003)
- Nick Luck (2006–2011)
- Laffit Pincay III (2007)
- Jay Privman (2002–2011)
- Kenny Rice (1982–2003)
- Tom Rinaldi (2006–2011)
- Jeremy Schaap (2006, 2010–2011)
- Gary Seibel (2001)
- Sharon Smith (1980–1990)
- Rob Stone (2007)
- Joe Tessitore (2006–2007)
- Lesley Visser (1994–2000)
- Sandra Neil Wallace (1991–1998)
- Jack Whitaker (1996–2001)
