= List of Thoroughbred Racing on ABC commentators =

ABC's thoroughbred racing commentators served as race callers, hosts, analysts, handicappers, and reporters, with the tenures listed below spanning 1975 to 2011. Several commentators served in more than one of these roles.

== Race Callers ==
- Chic Anderson (1975–1977)
- Dave Johnson (1978–1980, 1984–1985, 1987–2000)
- Mike Battaglia (1981–1986)
- Marshall Cassidy (1986)
- Tom Durkin (2006–2010)
- Trevor Denman (2008–2011)

== Hosts ==
- Chris Schenkel (1975–1976)
- Jim McKay (1975–2000)
- Al Michaels (1986–2000)
- Brent Musburger (2004–2008)
- Terry Gannon (2005–2006)
- Kenny Mayne (2006–2011)
- Chris Fowler (2006–2007)
- Joe Tessitore (2007–2011)

== Analysts ==
- John Rotz (1975)
- Eddie Arcaro (1977–1981)
- John M. Veitch (1982)
- Bill Hartack (1983–1986)
- Charlsie Cantey (1986–2000)
- Steve Cauthen (1993)
- Catherine Crier (2004)
- Jerry Bailey (2006–2011)
- Dave Johnson (1987–2000)
- Nick Luck (2008–2011)
- Lesley Visser (1994–2000)

== Handicappers ==
- Howard Cosell (1975–1985)
- Hank Goldberg (1998–2000, 2004–2011)
- Randy Moss (2006–2011)
- Rick Reilly (2008–2009)
- Jessica Pacheco (2008)

== Reporters ==
- Thea Andrews (2004–2006)
- Howard Cosell (1975–1985)
- Chris Schenkel (1978)
- Jack Whitaker (1982–1995)
- Frank Gifford (1983)
- Lynn Swann (1986–1990)
- Robin Roberts (1991–2000)
- Lesley Visser (1994–2000)
- Charlsie Cantey (1986–2000)
- Jeannine Edwards (2006–2011)
- Quint Kessenich (2006)
- Jeremy Schaap (2006, 2010–2011)
- Tom Rinaldi (2006–2010)
- Rece Davis (2007–2009)
- Caton Bredar (2007–2011)
- Jay Privman (2008–2011)
- Steve Cyphers (2008–2011)
- Pat Forde (2008)
- Bill Nack (2008–2011)
- Rick Reilly (2009)
- Chris Connelly (2009)
