= List of Thoroughbred Racing on NBC commentators =

Commentators listed for NBC's thoroughbred racing coverage have worked on the coverage from 1980 to the present. Of the 50 commentators listed below, 10 are current and 40 are former.

== List ==
=== Present ===
- Jerry Bailey (2013–present)
- Andie Biancone (2026–present)
- Larry Collmus (2011–present)
- Britney Eurton (2018–present)
- Ahmed Fareed (2019–present)
- Nick Luck (2013–present)
- Randy Moss (2011–present)
- Eddie Olczyk (2014–present)
- Kenny Rice (1999–present)
- Mike Tirico (2017–present)

=== Past ===
- Pete Axthelm (1984–1985)
- Mike Battaglia (1993–2015)
- Michelle Beadle (2012–2013)
- Donna Brothers (2000–2026)
- Jill Byrne (2010)
- Charlsie Cantey (2000–2005)
- Marshall Cassidy (1980)
- Bob Costas (1997–2018)
- Trevor Denman (1988–2005)
- Tom Durkin (1984–2010)
- Josh Elliott (2014–2015)
- Dick Enberg (1981–1990)
- Bethenny Frankel (2009)
- Gayle Gardner (1992)
- Mary Ann Grabavoy (1994)
- Tom Hammond (1984–2016)
- Dave Johnson (1982–1986)
- Dan Kenny (1991–1992)
- Greg Lewis (1988)
- Terry Leibel (1992–1993)
- Rebecca Lowe (2019)
- Carolyn Manno (2014–2018)
- Chris McCarron (1986)
- Gregg McCarron (1989–1998)
- Bob Neumeier (1990–2017)
- Jenny Ornsteen (1989–1992)
- Harvey Pack (1984–1988)
- Jessica Pacheco (2010)
- Laffit Pincay III (2012–2021)
- Jay Privman (2012–2017)
- Jay Randolph (1984–1988)
- Elfi Schlegel (1993–1999)
- Brough Scott (1984–1988)
- Mike E. Smith (1998)
- Sharon Smith (1984–1990)
- Robyn Smith (1984)
- Melissa Stark (2004–2008)
- Gary Stevens (2006–2012)
- Jack Van Berg (1989)
- John M. Veitch (1991–1997)
- Krista Voda (2017)
