= Kentucky Juvenile Stakes =

- Class: Black Type
- Location: Churchill Downs; Louisville, Kentucky, United States
- Inaugurated: 1988 (as Kentucky Budweiser Breeders' Cup Stakes)
- Race type: Thoroughbred – Flat racing
- Website: www.churchilldowns.com

Race information
- Distance: 5 furlong sprint
- Surface: Dirt
- Track: left-handed
- Qualification: Two-year-olds
- Weight: Base weights with allowances: Colts and geldings: 122 lbs. Fillies: 119 lbs.
- Purse: $200,000 (since 2022)

The Kentucky Juvenile Stakes is an American Thoroughbred horse race held annually in early May at Churchill Downs in Louisville, Kentucky. The event is open to two-year-old horses. Previously a race contested at 5 1/2 furlongs on dirt, it has been run at a distance of five furlongs since 2006.

It first became a Grade III race in 1999. The event was not run in 2005 and six years later in 2011 was removed from the calendar. The event was resumed in 2016 as a Black Type event.

== Records ==
Speed record

- 5 furlongs – 0:57.46 – Rated Fiesty (2007)
- 5.5 furlongs – 1:03.11 – Leelanau (2001) (new track record)

Most wins by a trainer

- 7 – Steven M. Asmussen (2002, 2003, 2004, 2006, 2007, 2017, 2021) (five consecutive editions)

Most wins by a jockey

- 4 – Shane Sellers (1994, 1996, 1998 & 2004)

Most wins by an owner

- 4 – Heiligbrodt Racing Stable (2002, 2004, 2006, 2007)

== Winners of the Kentucky Juvenile Stakes since 1988 ==
Year	Winner	Jockey	Trainer	Owner	Distance	Time	Grade
2026	Waggley	Joel Rosario	Wesley A. Ward	Ten Broeck Farm, Inc.	5-fur.	1:00.37	
2025	Pinky Finger	Joel Rosario	Wesley A. Ward	Wesley A. Ward	5-fur.	0:58.32	
2024	West Memorial	Reylu Gutierrez	John A. Hancock	Swinbank Stables	5-fur.	0:58.29	
2023	Youalmosthadme	Tyler Gaffalione	Brad H. Cox	Qatar Racing, Swinbank Stables, Steve Adkisson & Black Type Thoroughbreds	5-fur.	0:57.49	
2022	Tom's Regret	Tyler Baze	Jorge Periban	Griffin Stables, Saul Carrillo, Victor M. Flores & Eugene Zondlo	5-fur.	0:58.23	
2021	† Vodka N Water	Ricardo Santana Jr.	Steven M. Asmussen	Hat Creek Racing	5-fur.	0:58.64	
2020	Not held						
2019	Rookie Salsa	Angel Suarez	Jeremiah O'Dwyer	Designated Hitters Racing	5-fur.	0:59.32	
2018	Weiland	Carlos Villasana	John Ennis	John Ennis	5-fur.	0:59.32	
2017	Buy Sell Hold	Florent Geroux	Steven M. Asmussen	Kirk Robison & Judy Robison	5-fur.	0:58.33	
2016	Silvertoni	Jose Valdivia Jr.	Wesley A. Ward	Silverton Hill LLC	5-fur.	0:58.63	
2011–2015		Not held					
2010	Lou Brissie	John R. Velazquez	Neil Howard	Dogwood Stable	5-fur.	0:57.80	III
2009	Aegean	René Douglas	Wesley Ward	Steven Michael Bell	5-fur.	0:58.24	III
2008	Run Away and Hide	Robby Albarado	Ronny Werner	Ronald K. Kirk, John C. Bates & Michael Riordan	5-fur.	0:57.56	III
2007	Rated Fiesty	Shaun Bridgmohan	Steven M. Asmussen	Heiligbrodt Racing Stables & JMJ Racing Stable	5-fur.	0:57.46	III
2006	Datrick	Shaun Bridgmohan	Steven M. Asmussen	Heiligbrodt Racing Stable	5-fur.	0:58.37	III
2005	Not held						
2004	Lunarpal	Shane Sellers	Steven M. Asmussen	Heiligbrodt Racing Stable	5.5-fur.	1:04.07	III
2003	Cuvee	Lonnie Meche	Steven M. Asmussen	Winchell Thoroughbreds	5.5-fur.	1:04.45	III
2002	Posse	Donnie Meche	Steven M. Asmussen	Heiligbrodt Racing Stable	5.5-fur.	1:03.73	III
2001	Leelanau	Jon Court	Steven Morguelan	Iron Horse Racing	5.5-fur.	1:03.11	III
2000	Gold Mover	Craig Perret	Mark A. Hennig	Edward P. Evans	5.5-fur.	1:03.67	III
1999	Chilukki	Robby Albarado	Bob Baffert	Stonerside Stable	5.5-fur.	1:04.01	III
1998	Yes It's True	Shane Sellers	D. Wayne Lukas	Padua Stables	5.5-fur.	1:03.61	
1997	Favorite Trick	Pat Day	Patrick B. Byrne	Joseph LaCombe	5.5-fur.	1:04.80	
1996	Move	Shane Sellers	Frank L. Brothers	Cherry Valley Farm	5.5-fur.	1:05.74	
1995	Miraloma	Donna Barton	D. Wayne Lukas	Robert B. Lewis & Beverly J. Lewis	5.5-fur.	1:04.04	
1994	My My	Shane Sellers	William H. Fires	Patricia B. Blass	5.5-fur.	1:05.96	
1993	Asta's Foxy Lady	Tracy J. Hebert	Byron Glibert	Valene Farms	5.5-fur.	1:05.51	
1992	Tempered Halo	Patrick A. Johnson	William I. Mott	John A. Franks	5.5-fur.	1:05.39	
1991	Hippomenes	Pat Day	Carlos A. Garcia	Prestonwood Farm	5.5-fur.	1:06.30	
1990	To Freedom	Julio C. Espinoza	John J. Tammaro Jr.	Prestonwood Farm	5.5-fur.	1:05.00	
1989	Summer Squall	Charles R. Woods Jr.	Neil J. Howard	Dogwood Stable	5.5-fur.	1:05.00	
1988	Island Escape	Charles R. Woods Jr.	Neil J. Howard	William S. Farish	5.5-fur.	1:04.60	

Notes:
† In the 2021 running of the event Averly Jane was first past the post and wagering was paid out as the winner, however the horse returned a positive swab testing positive for metformin and consequently was disqualified from the prize money and was placed seventh (last). Vodka N Water was declared the official winner of the event.
