= Del Mar Fairgrounds =

Event venue in Del Mar, California, United States

Coordinates: 32°58′34″N 117°15′43″W

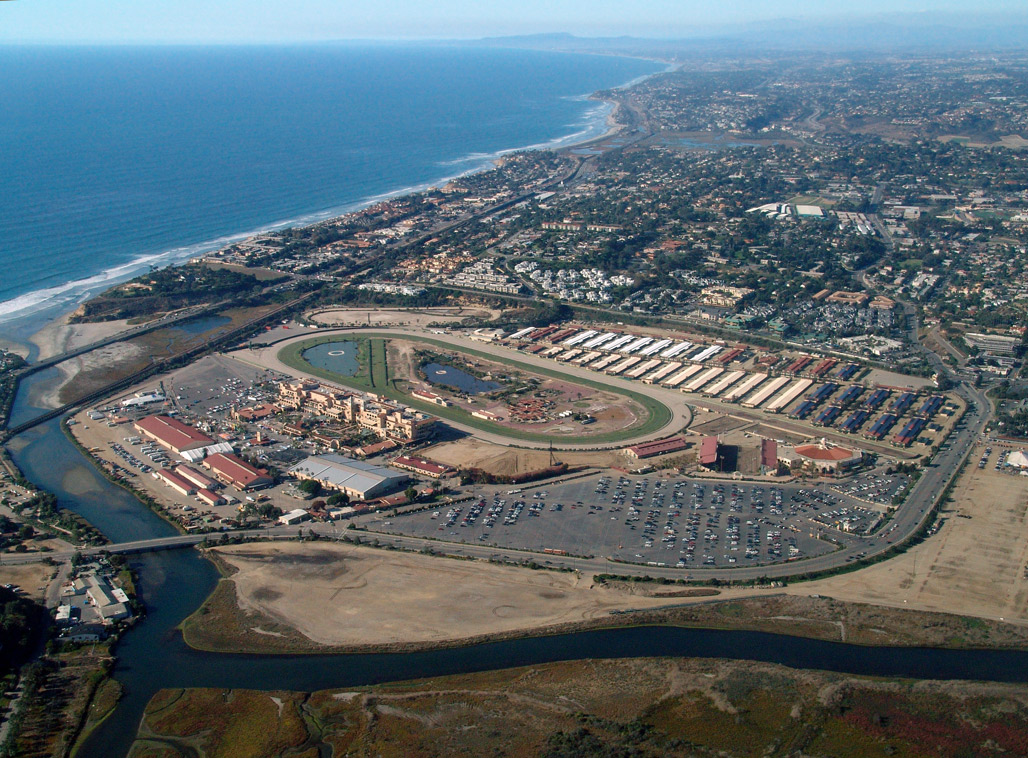
- Aerial view of the Del Mar Fairgrounds and Racetrack; looking northwest along the Pacific Ocean coastline
- Interactive map of Del Mar Fairgrounds
- Address: 2260 Jimmy Durante Boulevard; Del Mar, California; United States
- Owner: 22nd District Agricultural Association

Construction
- Opened: 1936

Tenant
- Del Mar Thoroughbred Club

Website
- www.delmarfairgrounds.com

The Del Mar Fairgrounds is an event venue in Del Mar, California, United States. It hosts the annual San Diego County Fair. The venue sits on a 370-acre (1.5 km^{2}) property along the Pacific Ocean coastline. It includes the Del Mar Racetrack, built in 1936 by the Del Mar Thoroughbred Club, with founding member Bing Crosby providing leadership.

The Del Mar Fairgrounds and Del Mar Thoroughbred Club share one address for the complex. The site is owned by the State of California and is managed by the 22nd District Agricultural Association, a state agency that hosts more than 300 annual events. Its staff organizes major annual events and runs Surfside Race Place, the year-round satellite horse racing facility. The Del Mar Thoroughbred Club leases the facilities for their live meets each year.

== History ==
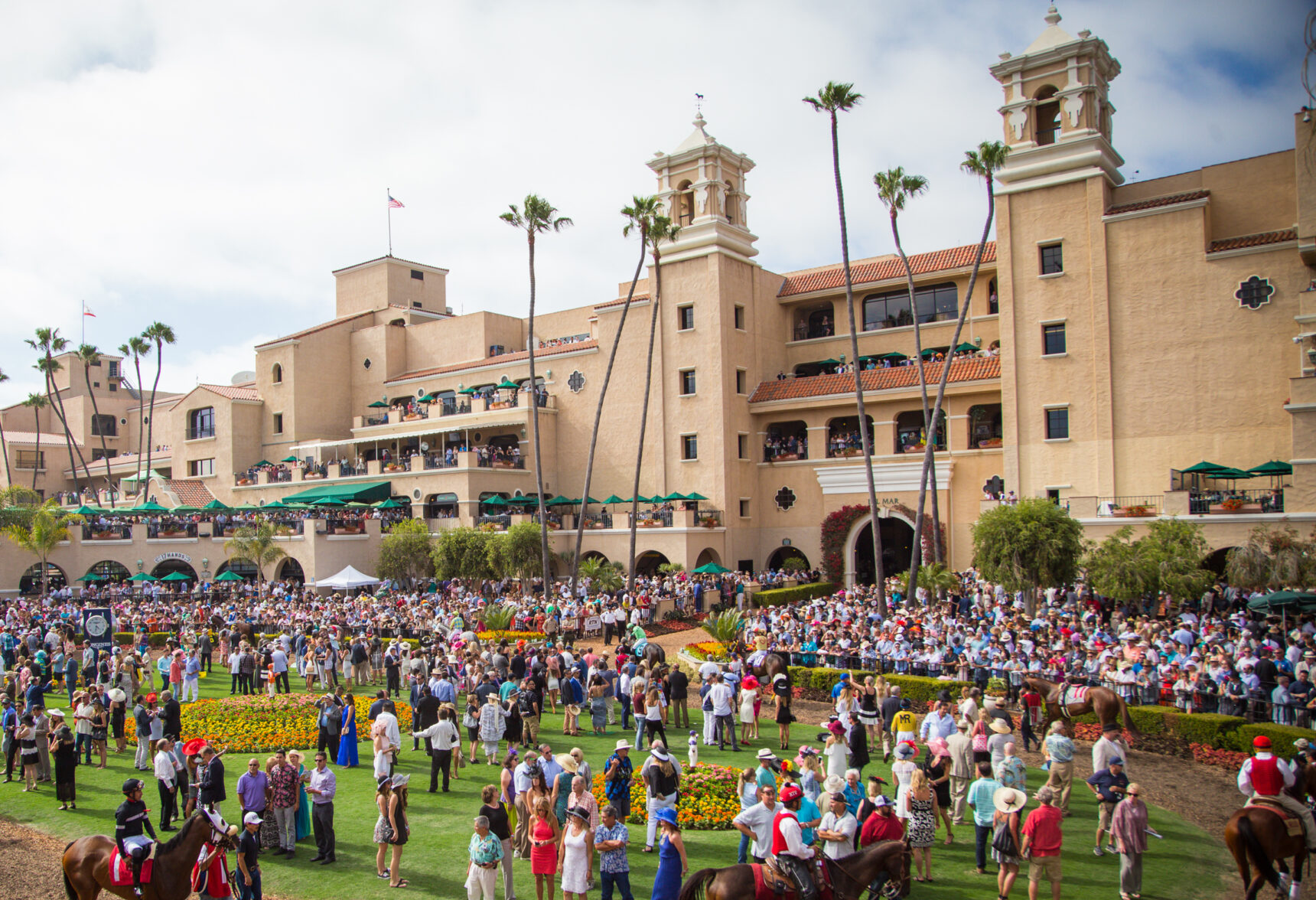
Historic Mission Revival architecture at Del Mar Racetrack.

After the opening of the Santa Anita Park racetrack in Arcadia, California on Christmas Day 1934, William A. Quigley, a resident of La Jolla, formed the idea of starting a racetrack on the Del Mar Fairgrounds. He pitched this to Bing Crosby, and they founded the Del Mar Turf Club on May 6, 1936. Quigley was General Manager of the racetrack until his death at the age of 49 in 1942. When the Del Mar Racetrack opened in 1937, Bing Crosby was at the gate to personally greet the fans. On August 12, 1938, the Del Mar Thoroughbred Club hosted a $25,000 winner-take-all match race between Charles S. Howard's Seabiscuit and the Binglin Stable's colt, Ligaroti. In an era when horse racing ranked second in popularity with Americans to Major League Baseball, the match race was the first nationwide broadcast of a thoroughbred race by NBC radio. In the race, Seabiscuit was ridden by jockey George Woolf and Ligaroti by Noel Richardson. In front of a record crowd that helped make Del Mar race track a success, Seabiscuit won by a nose.

By 1940, Del Mar became a summer playground for many Hollywood stars. Between 1942 and 1944, the facility was closed due to the Second World War. Initially, the grounds were used for training by the United States Marine Corps, then as a manufacturing site for parts to B-17 bombers.

The first Bing Crosby Stakes was held at Del Mar in 1946 and that same year the Santa Fe Railroad began offering a racetrack special bringing spectators, bettors, and horses to Del Mar from Los Angeles. Throughout the late 1940s and 1950s, the track became the Saratoga of the West for summer racing. The track had large purses for many stakes, many of which were won by the famous jockey Bill Shoemaker.

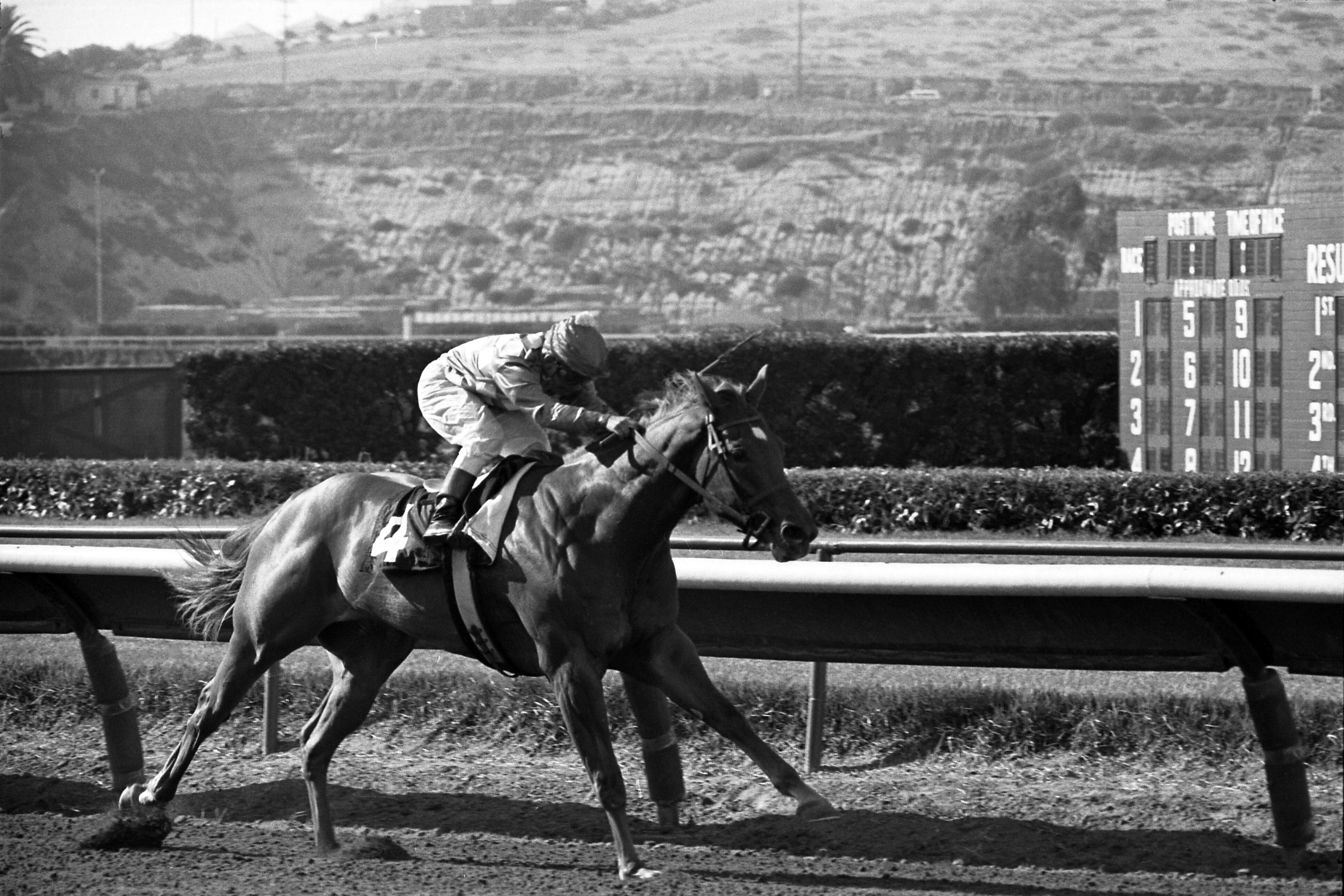
Bill Shoemaker in a race at Del Mar in 1970

Throughout the 1960s and 1970s, Del Mar was one of the premier racetracks in the country. The track attempted to run a fall meet in the 1960s but later canceled it after lackluster results. This allowed for the creation of the Oak Tree Racing Association at the Santa Anita race track.

In the 1980s, the infield was opened to spectators and in 1984 Trevor Denman became the voice of Del Mar and in the 1990s, the track underwent a major renovation. The grandstand of the Del Mar Fairgrounds was demolished and replaced. In 1991, the track ran its richest race to date, the $1,000,000 Grade I Pacific Classic Stakes. The first Classic was won by a top three-year-old named Best Pal.

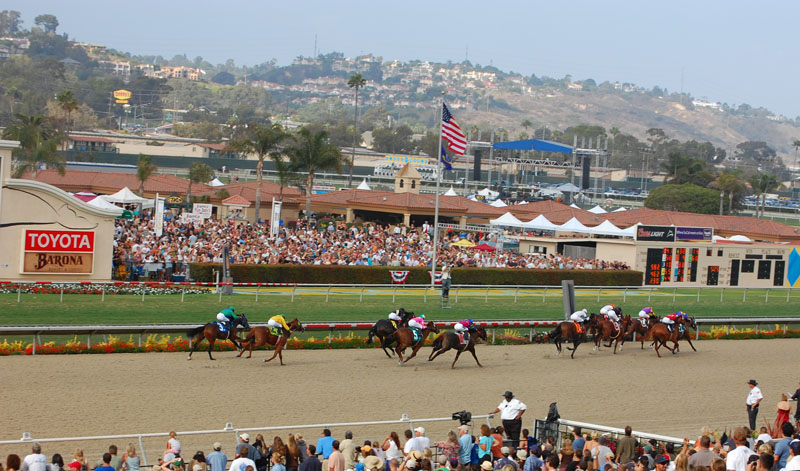
Horses crossing the finish line at the Del Mar Racetrack

Beginning in 2000, the Del Mar Thoroughbred Club's marketing team realized they had to attract a more youthful audience as well as a female audience. They focused Del Mar as a fashionable destination, using social media and other avenues to market the racetrack. They adopted the slogan "Cool as Ever" and created a new brand around "Del Mar Scene". They also hired jockey and model Chantal Sutherland to be the new face of the Del Mar Thoroughbred Club.

Del Mar has changed in demographics and audience attendance. The marketing campaign of the Del Mar Racetrack has been used as a Stanford business study to see if their strategy could be done at other racetracks.

One of the largest draws each year for the Del Mar Racetrack has become Opening Day with its hats contest and parties.

In March 2013, there was a vote to expand the turf portion of the racetrack. Construction began later in the year, and the work was completed in time for the 2014 racing season. The work included widening the course to 80 feet and softening the curve coming out of the diagonal chute, thus allowing more horses to compete in turf races. The following year, Del Mar renovated the main track, installing El Segundo Sand.

Starting in 2014, Del Mar began to run more racing cards due to the closure of the Hollywood Park Racetrack. A fall meet was added, featuring the Hollywood Turf Cup Stakes, Hollywood Derby, and Matriarch Stakes. Del Mar hosted the Breeders' Cup for the first time in November 2017 and for a second time in November 2021. The track is scheduled to host the Breeders' Cup again in 2024 and 2025.

The meet in 2020 was held behind closed doors due to the COVID-19 pandemic. Larry Collmus temporarily replaced Denman as Voice of Del Mar after 36 years for the summer meet. Denman did return for the fall meet in November, and resumed calling the Del Mar races in July 2021.

Similar to the meet in 2020, around the COVID pandemic period, it was decided that the KAABOO festival would also be relocated from the Padres to their original place in the Del Mar Fairgrounds. Mark Terry with FLAAC said “it made sense to bring [KAABOO] back to its inaugural home where it had performed so well.” “Its official: KAABOO music festival returning to Del Mar Fairgrounds in September 2024.” from San Diego Union Tribune also states that the “Board members for the 22nd District Agricultural Association, which runs the fairgrounds, approved the deal with Festival Licensing and Acquisition Corp.” KAABOO music festivals change of location was signed Tuesday and will take action in September 2024.

Construction of a special events train platform is planned adjacent to the fairgrounds, which will allow Amtrak Pacific Surfliner and NCTD Coaster trains to serve the site directly. It is scheduled for completion by mid-2031.

== Events ==
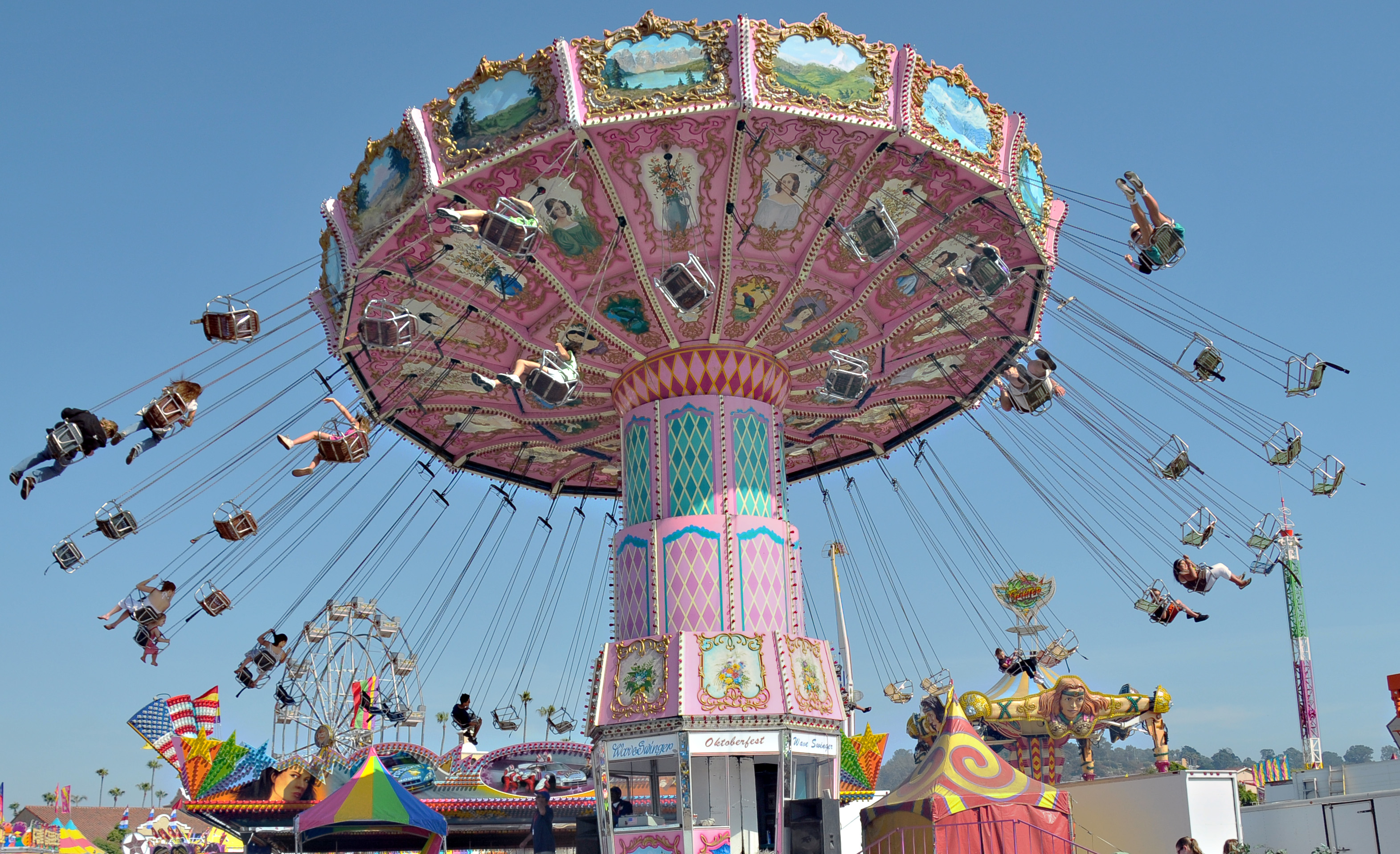
2008 San Diego County Fair

There are over 300 events that take place on the Del Mar Fairgrounds. Some of the most well known include:

- San Diego County Fair, previously known as Del Mar Fair
- Del Mar National Horse Show
- Scream Zone
- Holiday of Lights

=== Racing ===
The track races from July to September as well as a second meet in November through early December as of 2014. The following graded events were held at Del Mar in 2022.

Grade 1 :

- Bing Crosby Stakes
- Clement L. Hirsch Stakes
- Del Mar Debutante Stakes
- Del Mar Futurity
- Del Mar Oaks
- Pacific Classic Stakes

Grade 2 :

- Del Mar Mile Handicap
- Del Mar Derby
- Del Mar Handicap
- Eddie Read Stakes
- Hollywood Turf Cup Stakes
- John C. Mabee Stakes
- Pat O'Brien Stakes
- San Clemente Stakes
- San Diego Handicap
- Seabiscuit Handicap
- Sorrento Stakes
- Yellow Ribbon Handicap

Grade 3 :

- Best Pal Stakes
- Bob Hope Stakes
- Cecil B. DeMille Stakes
- Cougar II Stakes
- Del Mar Juvenile Turf Stakes
- Green Flash Handicap
- Jimmy Durante Stakes
- Native Diver Stakes
- Rancho Bernardo Handicap
- Red Carpet Stakes
- Torrey Pines Stakes

Ungraded stakes:

- Adoration Stakes
- Betty Grable Stakes
- Cary Grant Stakes
- Daisycutter Handicap
- Del Mar Juvenile Fillies Turf Stakes
- Desi Arnaz Stakes
- La Jolla Handicap
- Shared Belief Stakes (formerly the El Cajon)
- Oceanside Stakes
- Osunitas Stakes
- Pirate's Bounty Stakes
- Solana Beach Handicap
- Tranquility Lake Stakes
- Wickerr Stakes
- Windy Sands Handicap

Discontinued stakes :

- Cabrillo Handicap
- Junior Miss Stakes

=== Other events ===
- Opening Day at Del Mar with their famous hat contest
- Family Fun Day every Saturday and Sunday where the infield offers free entertainment for kids.
- Camp Del Mar: A Daycare center for the kids while the parents are spending the day at the track (discontinued in 2019).
- Giveaway Days: The items vary each year what is being given away

== Arena ==
Del Mar Arena is a 3,500-seat arena in the fairgrounds complex; and it is used for sporting events, concerts, and other special events. It was built in 1991. In 2009, it was remodeled and a roof was added.

It was home of the San Diego Sockers indoor soccer team from 2009 to 2012. The Del Mar National Horse Show is hosted here.

== Exhibit facilities ==
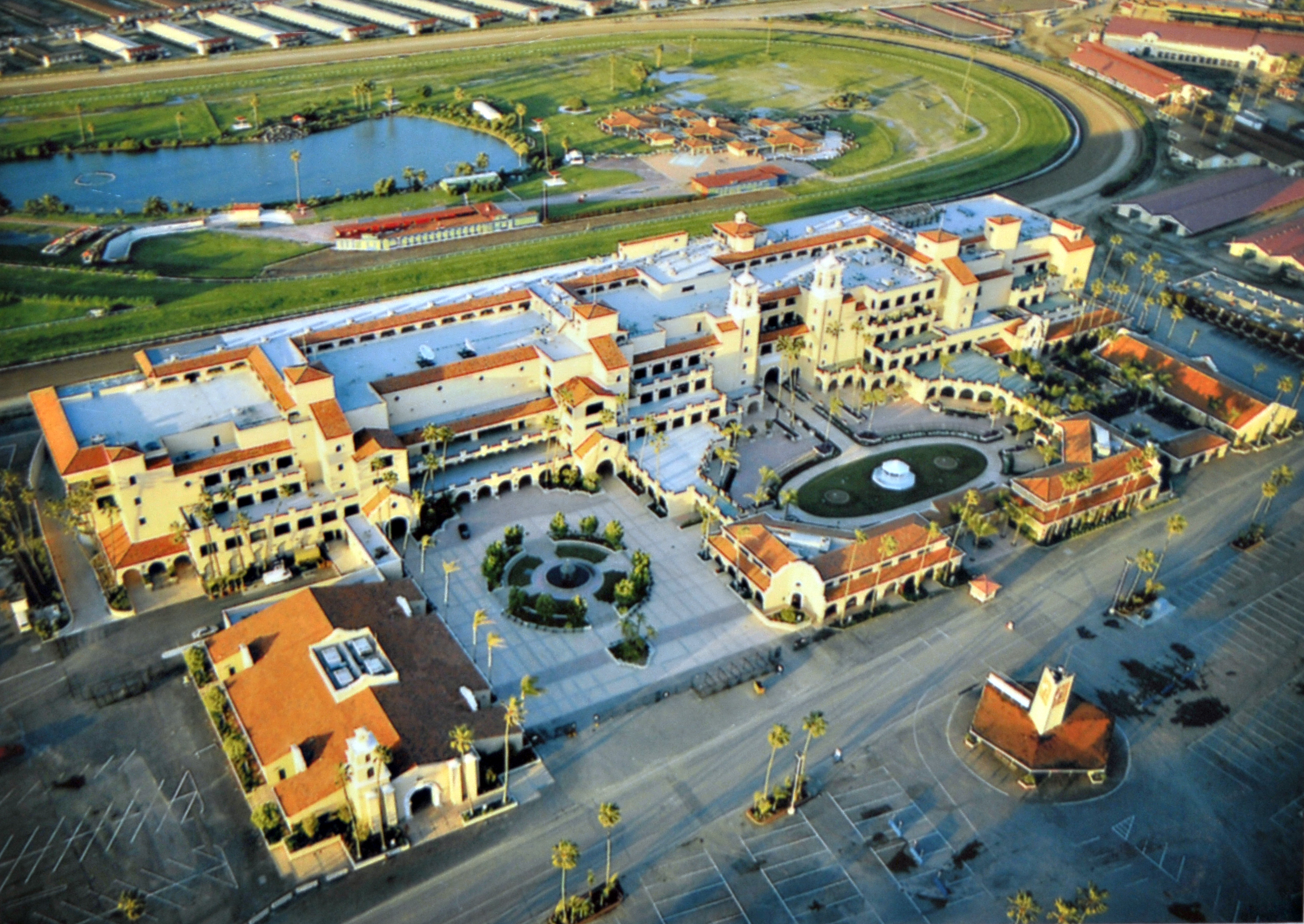
Exhibition facilities

Del Mar Fairgrounds features six exhibit halls totalling 219,380 square feet (20,381 m^{2}) of space. The largest is Pat O'Brien Hall with 68,680 square feet (6,381 m^{2}) of space, a ceiling height of 35 feet (11 m), and seating up to 6,800. Others include the 55,200-square-foot (5,130 m^{2}) Exhibit Hall seating up to 5,500; Bing Crosby Hall with 31,900 square feet (2,960 m^{2}) of space and seating up to 3,500; the 45-foot (14 m) Wyland Center with 30,800 square feet (2,860 m^{2}) of space and seating up to 3,000; the 19,800-square-foot (1,840 m^{2}) Activity Center seating up to 2,200; and Mission Tower with 13,000 square feet (1,200 m^{2}) of space and seating up to 1,200.

== Del Mar Golf Center ==
The Del Mar Fairgrounds includes the Del Mar Golf Center which includes two 18 hole miniature golf courses, 16 Top Tracer stalls, a mat and grass driving range, a golf store, and offers private lessons, clinics, and classes.

During peak demand periods, e.g. during the Live Races and the San Diego Fair, the driving range is used for additional parking.

== Racetrack ==
Del Mar Thoroughbred Club
- Del Mar Thoroughbred Club logo
- Interactive map of Del Mar Thoroughbred Club
- Location: Del Mar, California
- Operated by: Del Mar Thoroughbred Club
- Date opened: July 3, 1937
- Race type: Thoroughbred
- Course type: Turf, Dirt
- Notable races: Pacific Classic (G1); Eddie Read Stakes (G1); Del Mar Oaks (G1); Bing Crosby Stakes (G1); Clement L. Hirsch Stakes (G1); Del Mar Debutante (G1); Del Mar Futurity (G1)

The horse racing track is exactly 1 mile (1.609 km) long, and races are run counter-clockwise. With a capacity of 44,000, it is the second largest horse-racing venue in the western United States, after the nearby Santa Anita Park. It is known for the slogans: "Where The Turf Meets The Surf" as well as "Cool as Ever." It was built by a partnership including Bing Crosby, actors Pat O'Brien, Gary Cooper, Joe E. Brown, Charles S. Howard and Oliver Hardy. A 100-mile AAA championship Indianapolis-type car race was held at Del Mar in November 1949, but the death of popular local driver Rex Mays in that event caused "big car" racing to disappear from Southern California circuits for 18 years. (In addition, the horse racing community was deeply resentful of oil-dripping cars being run on the horse-oriented dirt racing surface.)

There was a temporary auto-racing circuit held in the race track parking lot during the mid-1960s and between 1987 and 1992. The latter hosted an IMSA Camel GT race. Both circuits were 1.600 mi (2.575 km) long with layouts that were different from each other.

The Del Mar Racetrack runs live racing from July through early September and, since 2014, a second live meet is run in November. A satellite wagering facility operates during the other months of the year. Larry Collmus temporarily replaced Trevor Denman in 2020 after 36 years due to the COVID-19 pandemic; Denman returned to announcing at the Del Mar summer meet in July 2021 while Collmus continues to call the fall meet.

=== Race lap records ===
The fastest official race lap records at the Del Mar Racetrack are listed as:

| Category | Time | Driver | Vehicle | Event |
IMSA Grand Prix Circuit (1987–1992): 1.600 mi (2.575 km)
| GTP | 1:00.334 | Juan Manuel Fangio II | Eagle MkIII | 1992 Vons Grand Prix of San Diego |
| GTP Lights | 1:06.390 | Dan Marvin | Spice SE91P | 1992 Vons Grand Prix of San Diego |
| GTO | 1:07.768 | Robby Gordon | Ford Mustang | 1992 Vons Grand Prix of San Diego |
| GTU | 1:13.402 | John Fergus | Dodge Daytona | 1991 Camel Grand Prix of Greater San Diego |
| AAC | 1:13.829 | Steve Anderson | Pontiac Firebird | 1991 Camel Grand Prix of Greater San Diego |
Original Grand Prix Circuit (1958–1964): 1.600 mi (2.575 km)
| Group 4 | 1:07.200 | Frank Monise | Lotus 23B | 1964 S.C.C.A. Divisional Del Mar |
| Group 3 | 1:09.500 | Scooter Patrick; Don Hulette | Adam-Mitchell Porsche Special; Jaguar Special-Chevrolet | 1961 Pacific Coast Championship Sports Car Road Races Del Mar |

=== Physical attributes ===
The track has a one-mile oval with chutes for 7/8 and 1 1/4-mile races and a seven-eighths mile oval with a diagonal straightaway chute for 1 1/16 and 1 1/8 mile races on the turf course. The turf is a mixture of Common Bermuda and Hybrid Bermuda (GN-1). The track hosts live racing for two seasons each year at the Del Mar Fairgrounds and can stable more than two thousand horses. Del Mar is known for its tan stucco grandstand located in close proximity to the Pacific Ocean.

In early 2007, Del Mar became the second track in Southern California to install a synthetic surface and the first to install a Polytrack brand surface for a price of approximately $9 million. However, in February 2014 Del Mar president Joe Harper announced his intention to return to a dirt surface for the 2015 racing season. Harper cited a lack of synthetic surfaces in Southern California as the reason for the switch. At the time, both Santa Anita Park and Hollywood Park had both experimented with a synthetic surface but then reverted to dirt.

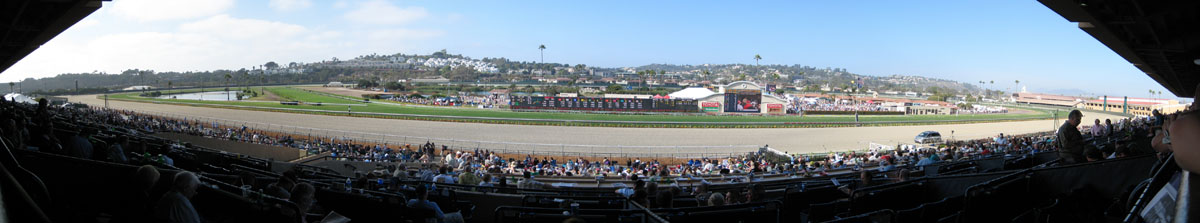
Panoramic view of the Del Mar Racetrack from the grandstand

=== TV personalities ===
- Ernie Myers
- Jon Lies (2007–present)
- Bob Ike (?–present)
- Mike Willman (?-2006 full-time, 2007–2009 part-time)

== Premium clubs ==
The Turf Club

The Turf Club is the Premium Club of the Del Mar Thoroughbred Club. It is necessary to be a member, or a guest of a member, to visit the Turf Club. A buttoned up shirt and jacket are required attire for men.

The Saddle Club

The Saddle Club is the Premium Club of Surfside Race Place. Anybody may visit for a daily fee. There is no required dress code.

The two clubs have no relation to one another. Membership in one does not grant access to the other.

== Satellite wagering ==
Surfside Race Place
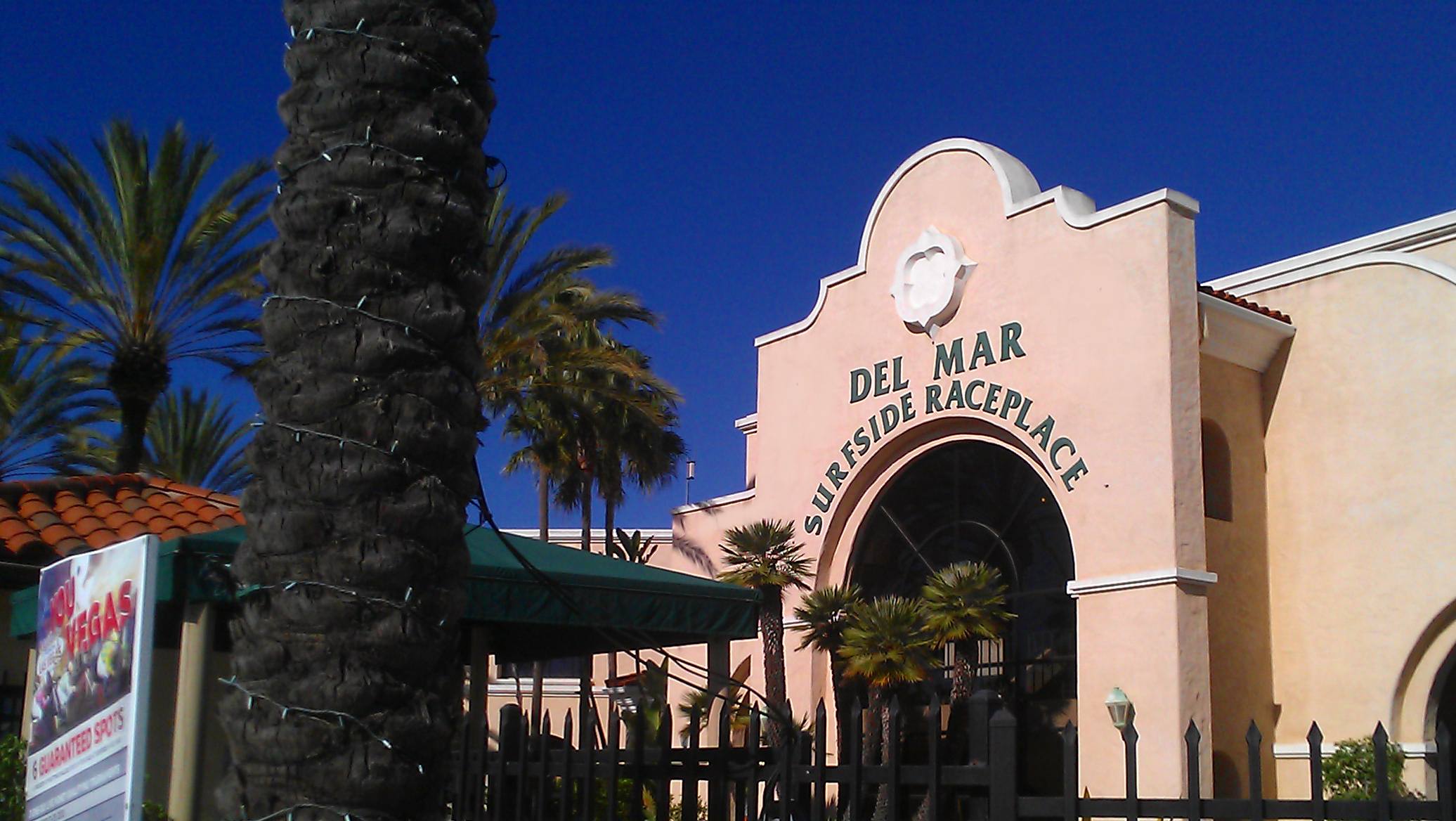
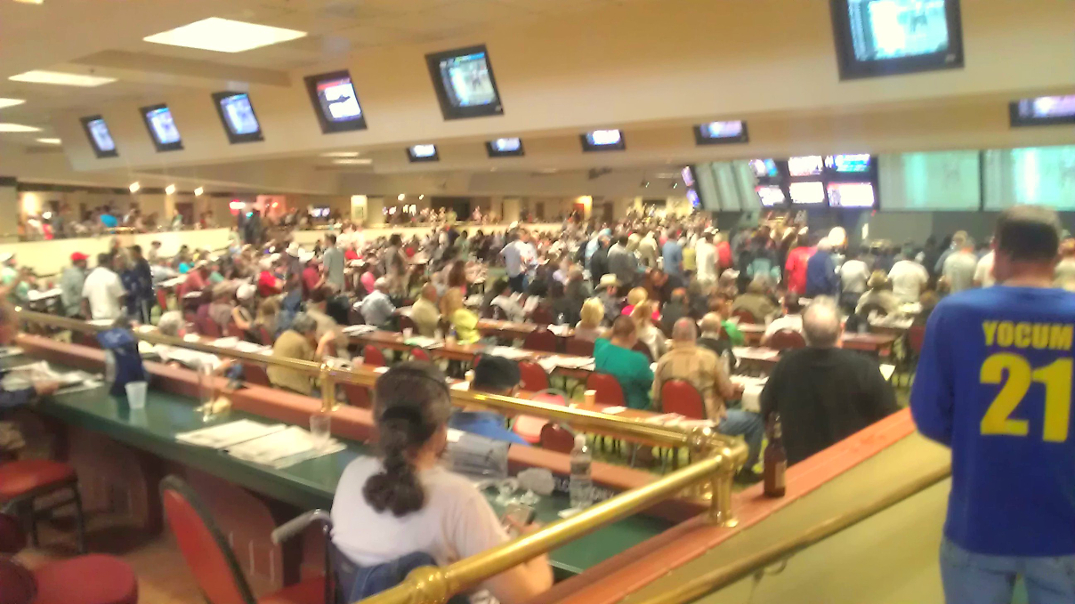
The Exterior and interior, showing the satellite wagering facility and sports bar

Surfside Race Place is located on the Del Mar Fairgrounds. The off-track betting facility is open during the off-season of the Del Mar Racetrack live meets.

It has been used for handicapping contests as well as handicapping seminars. The 2014 Handicapper of the year Jose Arias qualified and won here. His check at the end was $750,000.

Patrons of the Surfside Race Place sports bar can view, and bet on, horse races televised via satellite from around the country, such as Aqueduct, Arlington Park, Belmont Park, Calder, Cal Expo Harness, Churchill Downs, Delaware Park, Ellis Park, Fair Grounds, Golden Gate Fields, Gulfstream Park, Hastings, Hawthorne, Kentucky Downs, Laurel Park, Los Alamitos, Meadowlands, Monmouth Park, Oaklawn Park, Pimlico, Remington, Santa Anita Park, Saratoga, Sunland Park, Turfway Park, Victoria Race Tracks, and Woodbine; high-stakes races such as the Dubai World Cup; and Grade 1 races such as the Kentucky Derby, Preakness Stakes, and Belmont Stakes which constitute the Triple Crown.

Surfside Race Place currently offers bingo on Sundays.

== Del Mar Horsepark ==
Del Mar Horsepark is a 65 acres (26 ha) equestrian facility located 3 miles (4.8 km) east of the Del Mar Fairgrounds. The park offers:

- Two grass jumping stadiums with seating for 1,320
- Covered and lighted arena
- Four show rings
- 400 permanent show stalls
- Dressage ring
- Four training rings

During the San Diego Fair the Del Mar Horsepark offers free parking for the fairgrounds patrons with free shuttle service to the fairgrounds.

== Del Mar Municipal Airport ==
In the 1920s, the United States Navy built the San Dieguito Air Field on the wetlands between the San Dieguito River, the Del Mar Racetrack, and the area where Interstate 5 now runs. In 1938, the airfield was turned over to civilian control and became the Del Mar Municipal Airport. It served the patrons at the newly opened Del Mar Fairgrounds.

During World War II, the Navy reactivated and expanded the facility as the Naval Auxiliary Air Facility (NAAF) Del Mar, a satellite base for blimp operations under the command of the U.S. Navy Lighter-than-Air program. From Del Mar, Navy K-class airships conducted coastal patrols to detect enemy submarines and escort convoys along the Pacific coast. Although the base did not include permanent hangars, it was favored for its proximity to the coast and relatively low air traffic, which made it suitable for training flights and location filming.

Notably, NAAF Del Mar was used in the production of the 1945 Metro-Goldwyn-Mayer feature film This Man's Navy, starring Wallace Beery. The base provided exterior airship footage and staging areas, while scenes requiring hangar interiors were filmed at the larger Naval Lighter-Than-Air Station Santa Ana.

After the war, the field was decommissioned and returned to the state of California. In 1959, the state closed the airport entirely, and the land was used for the construction of Interstate 5.

== See also ==
- List of convention centers in the United States
