= Rece Davis =

American sports television journalist (born 1965/66)

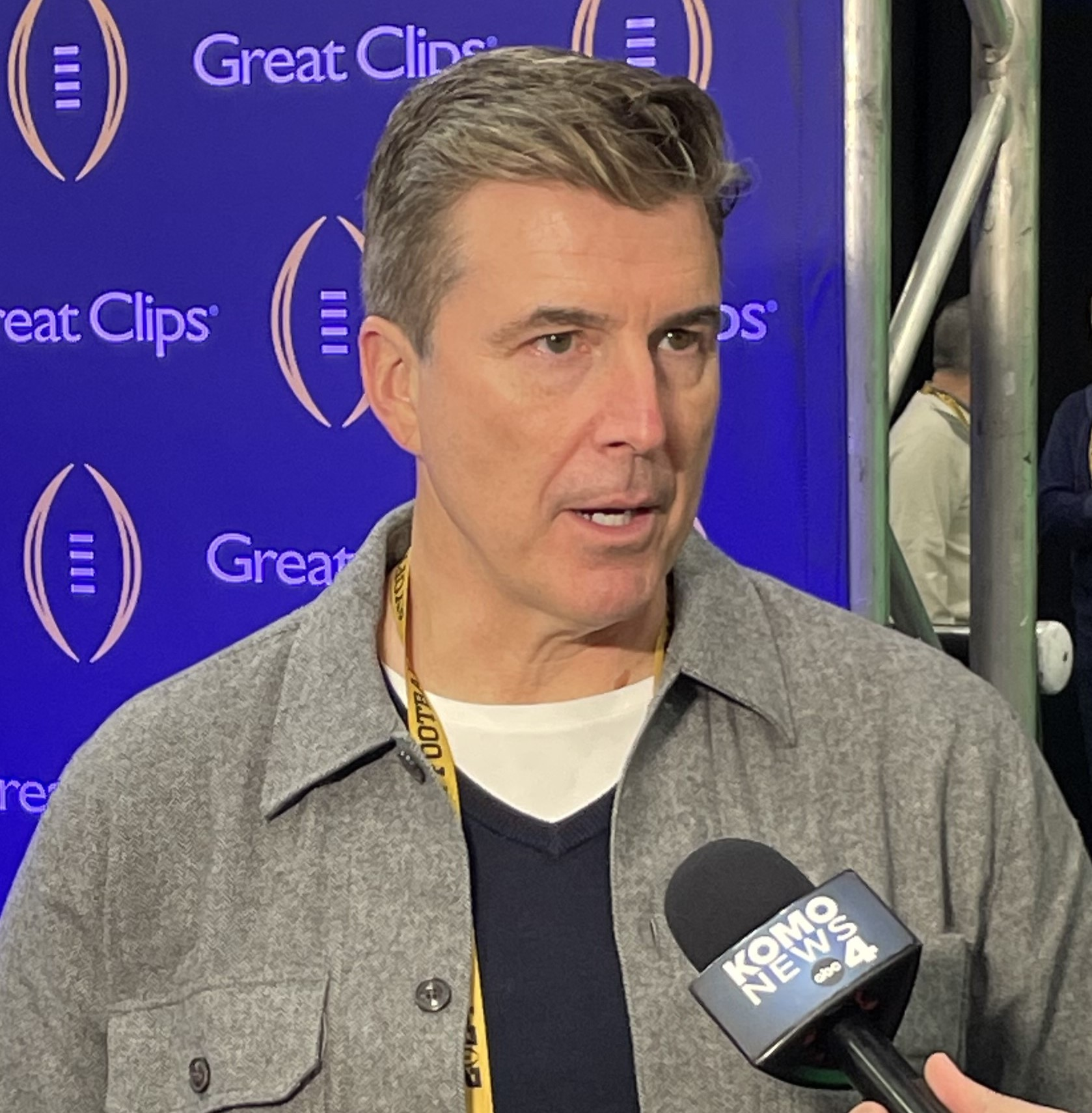
- Davis in 2024
- Born: William Laurece Davis; 1965 or 1966 (age 60–61); Chicago, Illinois, U.S.
- Education: University of Alabama (BA)
- Years active: 1983–present
- Sports commentary career
- Genres: Studio host; play-by-play
- Sports: College football; college basketball; soccer
- Employer: The Walt Disney Company via ESPN Inc. including ABC

William Laurece Davis (born 1965 or 1966) is an American sports television journalist for ESPN and ABC. Davis works as an anchor on SportsCenter and serves as host of various other programs on the network, including College GameDay football road show and basketball show. Since 2021, he has been ESPN's lead host for international soccer events.

== Early life and career ==
Davis was born in Chicago, Illinois, and was raised in Muscle Shoals, Alabama. Davis graduated in 1988 from the University of Alabama, earning Bachelor of Arts degrees in both Broadcast News and Public Affairs. While a student at Alabama, Davis regularly worked as a freelance television play-by-play announcer, studio host, and radio personality in select media outlets throughout the state, all positions that were primarily unpaid internships. In 1987, Davis began working as a general assignment reporter for WCFT-TV in Tuscaloosa, Alabama. In 2001, Davis was named as an outstanding alumnus of the University of Alabama's School of Communication and Information Sciences.

== Before ESPN ==
After graduating from Alabama, Davis served until 1993 in various positions at WRBL in Columbus, Georgia. At WRBL, Davis worked as a sports reporter, the lead weekend news anchor, and later as WRBL's sports director.

In 1993, Davis left Georgia for Flint, Michigan. Davis began working as a sports anchor and reporter at WJRT-TV, a position where the young journalist would quickly garner the attention of ESPN.

== Career at ESPN ==
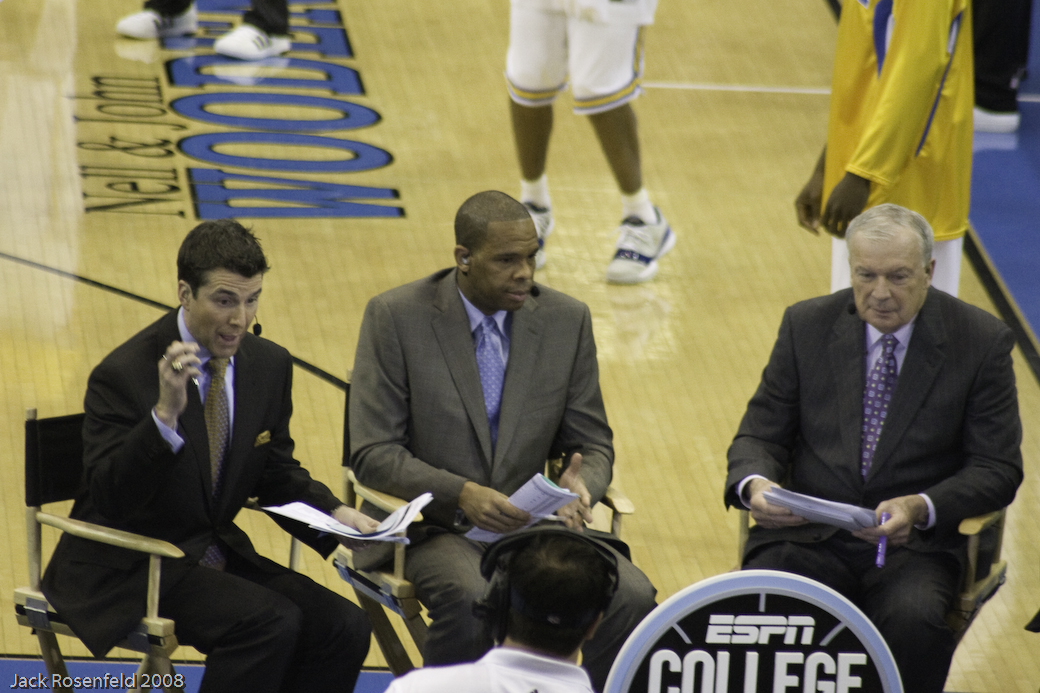
Davis, left, on ESPN, alongside Hubert Davis (center) and Digger Phelps.

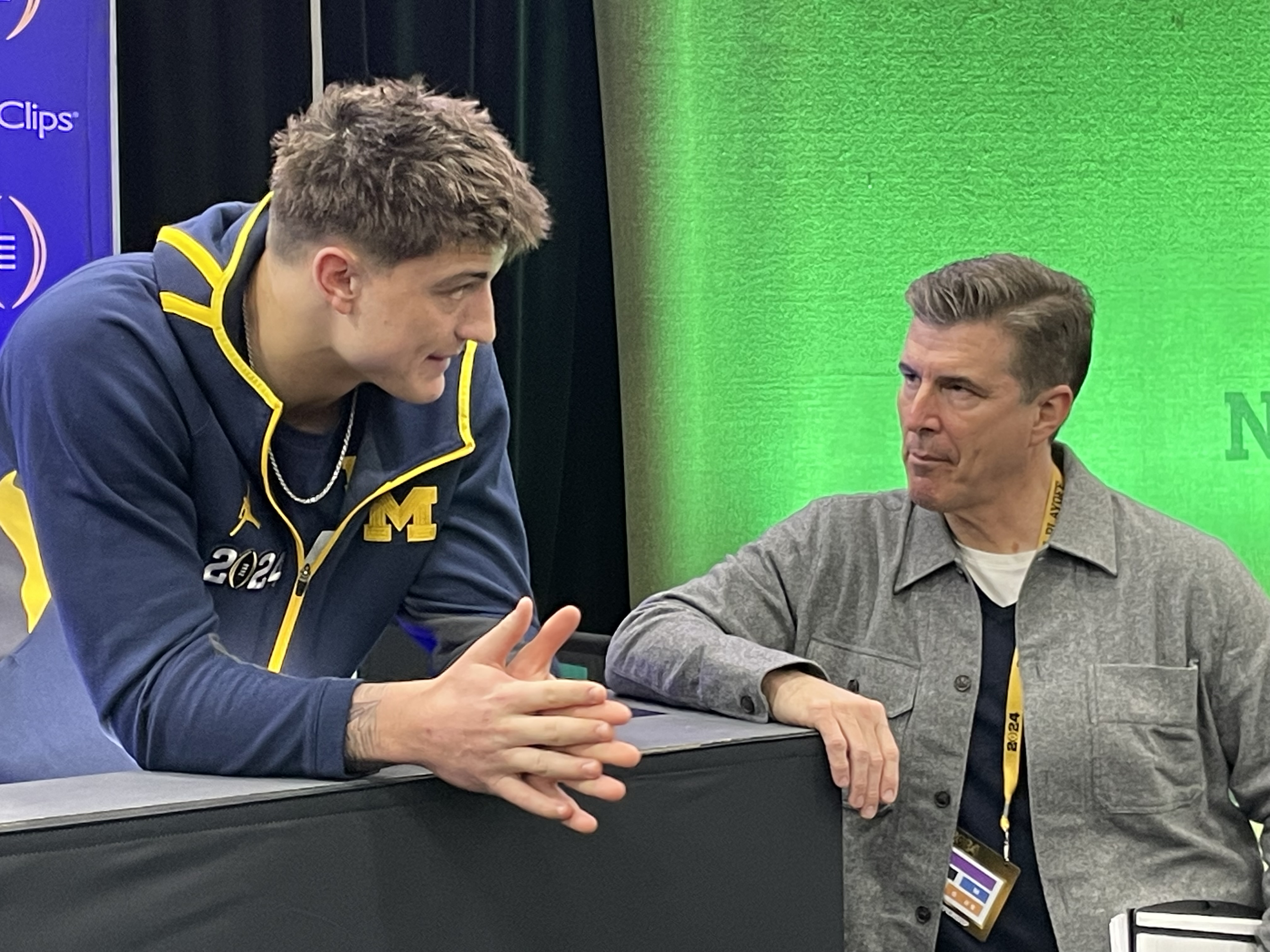
Davis interviewing Michigan Wolverines TE Colston Loveland ahead of the 2024 CFP National Championship.

Davis left WJRT and Flint in March 1995 for Bristol, Connecticut. He began working for the ESPN2 program SportSmash, where he provided five-minute reports on sports news and scores. Davis hosted ESPN2's NBA 2Night in 1996 and 1997. From 1997 through 1999, Davis served as studio host of ESPN2's weekend RPM 2Night and Sunday morning RPM 2Day programs. Davis went on to anchor the program SportsCenter, alongside a number of other ESPN personalities. Davis also frequently gave the "Extra Point" report of The Dan Patrick Show on ESPN Radio, and from time to time was a guest host on the program.

Davis works on SportsCenter, college football and college basketball for the network. Previously, Davis hosted horse racing telecasts during the Triple Crown season.

Davis was formerly the regular season host of College Football Live which airs daily during college football season and has served as the studio anchor of College GameDay football show and College Football Final. He is also the host of the College GameDay basketball road show.

From 2006 to 2009, he was one of the hosts for ABC's coverage of the 2006 FIFA World Cup and the lead host of UEFA Euro 2008 and 2009 FIFA Confederations Cup. He returned to soccer as the host of UEFA Euro 2020 on ESPN/ABC.

On February 5, 2015, ESPN announced Davis signed a multi-year contract with the network through 2021 that included taking over as host of the College GameDay football road show in 2015 for Chris Fowler, who had hosted the show since 1990. The deal also sees Davis discontinue his ESPN College Football Thursday Primetime duties but continue his weekly basketball play-by-play role.

Davis said of his work at ESPN, "I don't think of my job as being hard. I know I'm the luckiest guy around. I get to watch basketball and talk about it. When you never feel as if you go to work, it's really easy and fun to do the homework."

== Personal life ==
Davis is a Christian. He is married to Leigh Davis. They have one son and one daughter.
