= Chris Lincoln =

American sportscaster

Chris Lincoln (born November 11, 1947) is an American sportscaster who called College Football on ABC from 1976 to 1979 and hosted ESPN's horse racing coverage from 1985 to 1998. He recently "semi-retired" from a stint as sports director at KTUL-TV (ABC) in Tulsa, Oklahoma.

== Early life ==
Lincoln was born in Baltimore, Maryland. He attended high school in Warren, Michigan, where he began his career covering sports writing for his high school newspaper and the Royal Oak Tribune.

He attended the University of Missouri from 1965 to 1970. There, he worked as a student assistant in the Sports Information office and wrote for the Columbia Daily Tribune. He also worked at KFRU as a sports anchor and play-by-play announcer for David H. Hickman High School games. Additionally, he served as a reporter for the University of Missouri Sports Network and provided network cut-ins for ABC Radio.

== Local broadcasting ==
In 1974, Lincoln became sports director at KTUL. While serving in this capacity, he hosted the University of Oklahoma's football replay show with Coach Barry Switzer and with shows for Oklahoma State University, the University of Tulsa, and Oral Roberts University.

He also called games for the Tulsa Roughnecks, Oklahoma Outlaws, and Tulsa Twisters.

== Winnercomm ==
In 1981, Lincoln left KTUL to form Winner Communications (now Winnercomm), a television sports production company. The company would become the largest independently owned sports production company in the United States. Winnercomm also owns and operates Skycam and Cablecam. Lincoln and his partner sold a majority of the company to outside investors in February 2006, but Lincoln has remained with Winnercomm as Senior Consultant for Special Projects.

== National broadcasting ==
In 1976, Lincoln was hired by ABC Sports to serve as one of the network's regional college football play-by-play announcers.

From 1982 to 1998, Lincoln worked for ESPN, where he hosted thoroughbred and quarter horse races and the weekly Racehorse Digest. In 1998, Lincoln hosted the Kentucky Derby post position draw and was responsible for drawing the numbers. He called the number 15 for two horses, causing the entire draw to be redone. After the incident, Churchill Downs president Tom Meeker declared that neither ESPN nor Chris Lincoln would be involved in the draw again.

Lincoln also called college football, college basketball, and Canadian Football League games for ESPN.

In 1999, Lincoln became the global presenter for the World Racing Championship Series.

== Return to Tulsa ==
In May 2007, Lincoln returned to KTUL as Executive Sports Director. Lincoln anchored the weeknight sports from May 2007- August 2011. Lincoln retired from evening news in 2011 to hand the position to Rick Pendergraft and John Moss. Moss was later named sports director in January 2013.
