= Patricia Cooksey =

American jockey

Personal information
- Born: February 25, 1958 (age 68) Youngstown, Ohio; United States
- Occupation: Jockey

Horse racing career
- Sport: Horse racing
- Career wins: 2,137

Major racing wins
- Clipsetta Stakes (1980); My Charmer Stakes (1982, 1985); Ellis Park Lieutenant Governor Stakes (1983); Hollywood Prevue Stakes (1983); Ellis Park Debutante Stakes (1984); Ellis Park Governor's Handicap (1984); Cincinnati Trophy Stakes (1985, 1987); Fairway Fun Stakes (1985); Pocahontas Stakes (1986); Edgewood Stakes (1987); Fairmount Park Budweiser Handicap (1987); John Battaglia Memorial Stakes (1987); Wilma C. Kennedy Stakes (1988); Winter Storm Stakes (1988); Banner Bob Stakes (1990); James C. Ellis Juvenile Stakes (1991); Pioneer Stakes (1991); Cradle Stakes (1993); Valdale Stakes (1996); Valley View Stakes (1999)

Racing awards
- Mike Venezia Memorial Award (2004); Turfway Park Leading Jockey - Winter/Spring (1981, 1983, 1985, 1995)

Significant horses
- Lt. Lao, Ava Romance, Dr. Bizzare, Kathy O

Patricia Joen "Patti" or "P.J." Cooksey (born February 25, 1958, in Youngstown, Ohio, United States) is a retired jockey from American Thoroughbred racing.

== Career ==
Cooksey won her first race with Turf Advisor at Waterford Park (now Mountaineer Park) in 1979. A four-time Turfway Park leading rider, Cooksey has won 2,137 wins since beginning her career in 1979, and she was the all-time leading female jockey by number of victories before Julie Krone overtook her.

In 1985 she became the first female jockey to ride in the Preakness Stakes, finishing 6th aboard Tajawa. In 2004, she became the first ever female jockey to be voted the NYRA's Mike Venezia Memorial Award, an honor given annually to a jockey who exemplifies extraordinary sportsmanship and citizenship.

Seriously injured during a race at Keeneland on April 12, 2003, Cooksey did not return to riding until March 2004. Suffering from severe pain as a result of a rod in her leg from the injury, she retired permanently in late June of that year, ranked second all-time in wins by a female jockey.

Cooksey has been a commenter for Louisville, Kentucky television stations and did reporting for ESPN on horseback during the 2006 Breeders' Cup broadcast.
