= Thoroughbred Racing on ABC =

ABC's coverage of Thoroughbred racing currently consists of a portion of the Breeders Cup. Previously, ABC's coverage also included the Kentucky Derby (1975–2000), the Preakness Stakes (1977–2000), and the Belmont Stakes (1986–2000, 2006–2010).

== Contract history ==
In 1977, ABC was awarded the contract to televise the Preakness. Triple Crown Productions was formed in 1985 after CBS terminated its contract with NYRA. ABC Sports won the rights to broadcast all three races, as well as many prep races. Ratings went up after the package was centralized. Other than the Kentucky Derby, the Preakness Stakes and Belmont Stakes were considered the two "other" races. ABC Sports, which had broadcast the Derby since 1975, wanted to televise all the races as a three race package. CBS Sports, which showed the other two races, had much lower ratings for them, with the possible exceptions of years in which the Crown was at stake like 1973, 1977, and 1978.

Combined broadcast arrangements with ABC continued until 2001, when NBC Sports took over. Under NBC, ratings continued to go up, by as much as 20 percent in some years. It did not hurt that many horses, like Funny Cide and Smarty Jones, were making Triple Crown runs during those years (although all of them failed). From 2002 to 2004, the Belmont had the highest ratings of any horse race on television.

After the 2004 Belmont race, the New York Racing Association ended its deal with NBC, citing a conflict over profit-sharing arrangements. ABC won the rights to the Belmont, and Triple Crown Productions was effectively dissolved related to bonuses and broadcast rights. The only function that Triple Crown Production still oversees is joint nomination fees and a small joint marketing effort.

In 2011, NBC Sports once again became the broadcaster of all three Triple Crown races in separate broadcast deals; including an extension to its existing rights to the Kentucky Derby and Preakness Stakes, plus establishing a new 5-year deal to broadcast the Belmont Stakes after ABC and ESPN declined to renew their previous contract. All three deals last through 2015, and include supplementary coverage on NBC Sports Network for all three races. The additional coverage included 14-1/2 hours of Kentucky Derby pre-race coverage including an hour and a half live special for the Kentucky Oaks and six and a half hours of Preakness Stakes pre-race coverage including a one-hour live special on the Black-Eyed Susan Stakes both carried on NBC Sports Network.

== See also ==
- Thoroughbred Racing on ESPN

== Personalities ==
Jim McKay missed the 1995 Preakness and Belmont Stakes, electing to undergo heart bypass surgery.
