= Larry Collmus =

American sports announcer

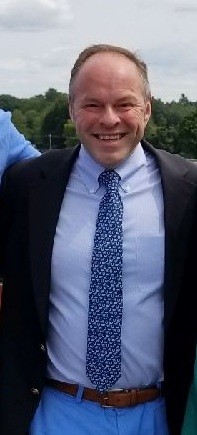
- Born: October 13, 1966 (age 60); Baltimore, Maryland
- Sports commentary career
- Sport: Thoroughbred horse racing

Larry Collmus (born October 13, 1966) is a Thoroughbred horse racing announcer and current track announcer for Del Mar Thoroughbred Club. A native of Baltimore, Collmus has called at numerous racetracks around the country. He is the race caller for NBC Sports' coverage of the Triple Crown and Breeders' Cup. He previously called races at Gulfstream Park, Monmouth Park, Suffolk Downs and NYRA.

== Commentary career ==
Collmus got his start by calling his first race at Bowie Race Track in 1985 at the age of 18. In 1985 and 1986, he served as the assistant announcer at Laurel Park, Pimlico, Bowie and Timonium Racetrack in his native Maryland. In 1987 he became the youngest announcer in the country after being named to call the races at Birmingham Turf Club in Alabama. After Birmingham, Collmus moved to California and became the announcer at Golden Gate Fields in the San Francisco area, a position he held until 1991 when he moved to take over announcing duties at Suffolk Downs in East Boston, Massachusetts.

Collmus' move to a major summer racing circuit occurred in 1994 when he became the announcer at Monmouth Park, host of the 2007 Breeders' Cup. After spending two years as the winter announcer at Aqueduct, he became the full-time announcer at Gulfstream Park in 2007. In 2011 he succeeded Tom Durkin as the voice of the Triple Crown and Breeders' Cup broadcasts on NBC Sports.

Collmus was named track announcer at Churchill Downs in the 2014 racing season. Notably, he called the races from November 19–23, 2008 as one of five potential announcers to replace Luke Kruytbosch. In 2015, Travis Stone took on regular race calling duties at Churchill Downs, although Collmus continues to call the Kentucky Derby for NBC as part of his Triple Crown duties.

On August 13, 2014, Collmus was announced to once again succeed Tom Durkin, this time as the voice of the New York Racing Association. He began calling the races at Aqueduct, Belmont Park and Saratoga Race Course in April 2015 as part of a five-year contract. He departed NYRA after his contract expired in 2020.

Collmus called races at Del Mar in 2020 as regular track announcer Trevor Denman did not attend due to the COVID-19 pandemic. Denman returned in 2021.

In March 2023, it was announced that Collmus would call the 2023 Dubai World Cup Night at Meydan Racecourse, replacing the regular Emirates Racing Authority caller Alistair Cohen. Cohen stated that the deal to hire Collmus was done behind his back and in response he terminated his ERA contract with immediate effect and returned to his native South Africa.

On July 19, 2023, Dennis Drazin, Chairman and CEO of Darby Development LLC bestowed upon Collmus, a 20-year Monmouth Park Racetrack announcer, the 2023 Bill Handleman Award for his work on 2023 $1 million Haskell Stakes (Grade 1).

On March 6, 2025, it was announced that Collmus would take over as the permanent track caller for Del Mar Thoroughbred Club. This announcement came after long time caller Trevor Denman announced his retirement after 22 years. Collmus previous called for Denman during the COVID-19 Pandemic at the track.

== Notable calls ==
Collmus earned national notice when on August 22, 2010, he called a race at Monmouth Park featuring two horses named Mywifenosevrything and Thewifedoesntknow. The two horses made a move on the back stretch and found themselves leading the race, with Collmus playing off the contrasts of the two horses' names in his stretch call:

... "Mywifenosevrything! Thewifedoesntknow! They're 1-2! Of course they are! Mywifenosevrything in front, to the outside, Thewifedoesntknow! Mywifenosevrything! Thewifedoesntknow! Mywifenosevrything... MORE than Thewifedoesntknow! (Monmouth Park - August 22, 2010 - Race 7)

Collmus' stretch call attracted worldwide attention and earned hundreds of thousands of views on YouTube.

Collmus has also called races at Saratoga Race Course, Belmont Park, Santa Anita Park, and the Meadowlands as well as numerous races broadcast on ESPN, Fox and CBS.

=== Triple Crown Calls ===
He had the call for NBC on June 6, 2015, when American Pharoah won the 147th running of the Belmont Stakes, in the process becoming the first Triple Crown winner since Affirmed in 1978:

... "And they're into the stretch, and American Pharoah makes his run for glory as they come into the final furlong. Frosted is second with one-eighth of a mile to go. American Pharoah's got a two-length lead. Frosted is all out at the sixteenth pole. And here it is! The 37-year wait is over! American Pharoah is finally the one! American Pharoah has won the Triple Crown!"

He also had the call of the 2015 Breeders' Cup Classic at Keeneland for NBC, where American Pharoah attempted to be racing's first Grand Slam winner:

..."And they're into the stretch, and American Pharoah has a four-length lead, Effinex is second, and then it's Frosted, Tonalist, and Honor Code. American Pharoah comes into his final furlong, and he's got a five, a six length lead as they come to the wire. A Triple Crown Winner, A Breeders' Cup winner, A HORSE OF A LIFETIME!!!"

In 2018, Collmus called another Triple Crown win, when Justify won the 150th Belmont Stakes:

..."A sixteenth to go. Justify is still there. Justify from Gronkowski--he's just perfect. And now he's just immortal! Justify is the 13th Triple Crown winner!
