= Terry Leibel =

Canadian journalist

Medal record

Equestrian

Representing Canada

Pan American Games
| Silver medal – second place | 1979 San Juan | Team jumping |

Terry Leibel is a Canadian retired journalist and former member of the Canadian Equestrian Team.

== Biography ==
Terry Leibel was an equestrian athlete throughout the 1970s. She was then hired by CBC Sports as an equestrian sports analyst. She was the first woman to host a CBC Olympic Games broadcast. She left the CBC for TSN in 1984 where she was the first woman to host a national sports program, SportsDesk, and worked there for two years before returning to the CBC.was the first woman to co-host CBC Sports Olympic coverage during the 1996 Summer Olympic Games in Atlanta, Georgia. She also covered the 2002 and 2006 Winter Olympic Games and the 2004 Summer Olympic Games. She was the first woman to do play-by-play for the Olympics, handling cycling, equestrian and white-water events for NBC Sports during the Summer Games in Barcelona in 1992.

Leibel announced her retirement on February 27, 2008.

== Awards and recognition ==
She earned Gemini Award nominations for her work in the Atlanta and Sydney Olympics and won a 2003 Gemini Award becoming the first female sports broadcaster to do so.
