= Tom Rinaldi =

American sportcaster

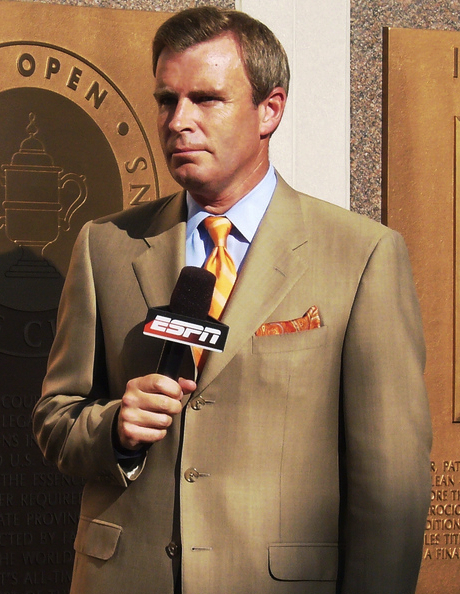
- Rinaldi in 2009
- Born: Brooklyn, New York, U.S.
- Education: University of Pennsylvania Columbia University
- Years active: 1983–present
- Sports commentary career
- Genres: Studio host, play-by-play
- Sports: College football, college basketball, soccer

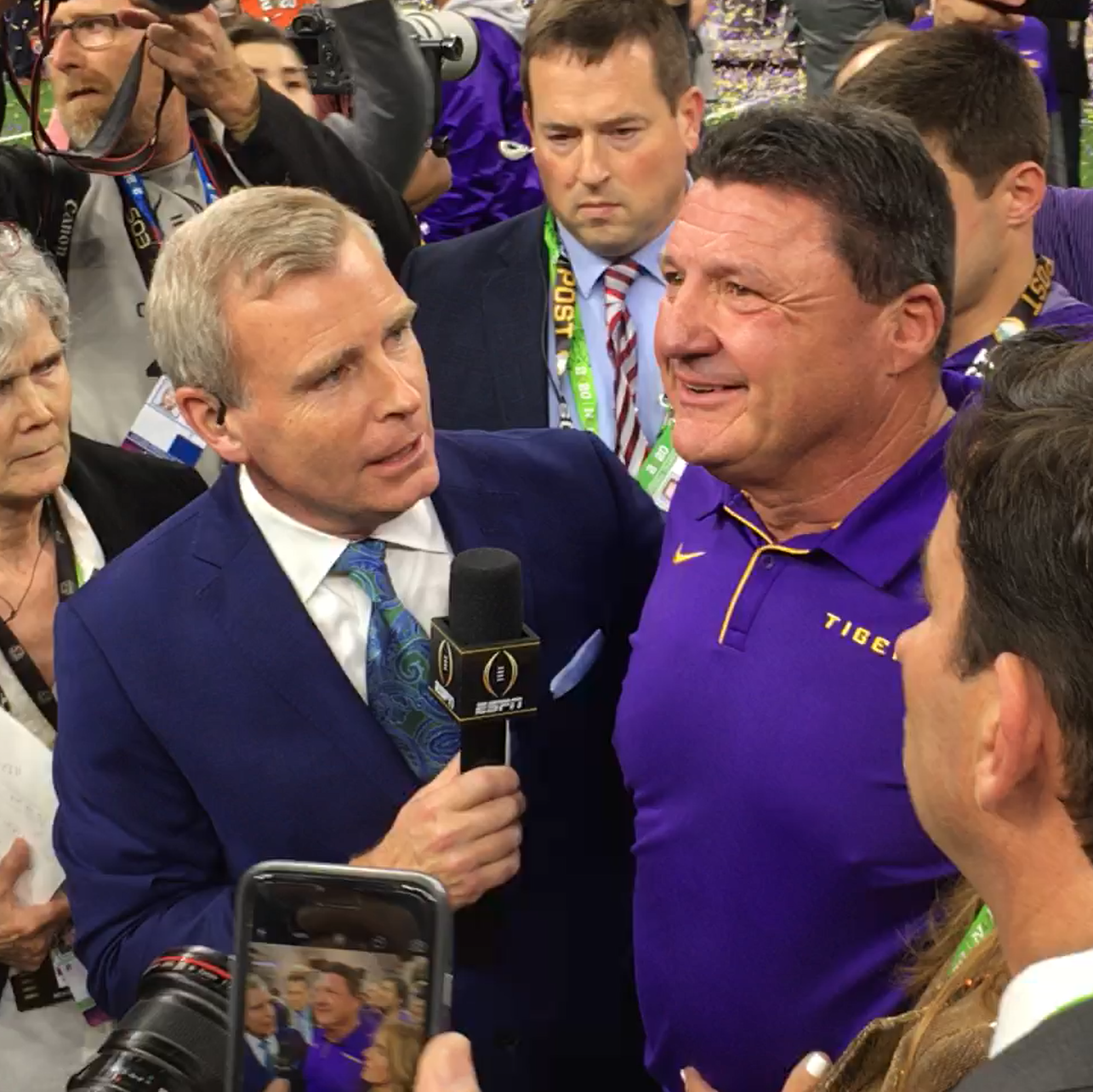
Rinaldi interviews LSU head coach Ed Orgeron immediately after the 2020 College Football Playoff National Championship.

Tom Rinaldi is an American reporter for Fox Sports coverage of the MLB All-Star game and World Series, the FIFA World Cup, the NFL and BIg Noon Kickoff pregame show. He previously contributed to ESPN's tennis coverage at Wimbledon and the US Open, ESPN's golf coverage, SportsCenter, Outside the Lines, College GameDay and Sunday NFL Countdown. He also did features for the horse racing telecasts.

== Professional career ==
Rinaldi joined ESPN in May 2003 following a four-year stint as a reporter for CNN/SI from 1998 to 2002. He worked as a reporter for KATU-TV in Portland, Oregon from 1996 to 1998 and for WNDU-TV in South Bend, Indiana from 1993 to 1996. In December 2020, it was announced that he had left ESPN to sign with Fox Sports, where he is expected to cover major sporting events, including the Super Bowl, World Series, World Cup and major college football games.

From 2006 to 2020, Rinaldi was the lead interviewer and feature reporter for ESPN and ABC's coverage of golf. In this capacity, he has been praised for many of his essays, especially those following the conclusion of major events. Rinaldi conducted the first interview of Tiger Woods after the incident on November 27, 2009, which led to Woods' public disclosure of his extra-marital affairs.

In 2017, Rinaldi served as a sideline reporter for the NBA playoffs on ESPN.

In June 2025, Rinaldi wrote and narrated the introduction for WWE's Night of Champions (2025) event in Riyadh, Saudi Arabia.

== Personal life ==
Rinaldi was born in Brooklyn, New York and grew up in Cresskill, New Jersey, graduating from Cresskill High School.

A first-generation college student, Rinaldi originally attended Fordham University, before transferring to University of Pennsylvania, where he was on the parliamentary debate team and earned an undergraduate degree in English. He received his graduate degree at Columbia University Graduate School of Journalism. He lives in nearby Tenafly, with his wife, Dianne, their son, Jack, and daughter, Tessa.

In 2016, he wrote a book called The Man in the Red Bandanna, about Welles Crowther, an NYC volunteer firefighter, who rescued 18 people before losing his own life when the World Trade Center collapsed after the September 11 attacks.

Prior to his career in journalism, Rinaldi was a high school English and English as a Second Language teacher in addition to being a handball coach at Morris High School in The Bronx. He had also taught at Shady Side Academy in Pittsburgh.

== Achievements ==
Rinaldi has won 16 Sports Emmy Awards, 7 Edward R. Murrow Awards, 3 Associated Press Awards and a USA Today Feature-of-the-Year Award.
