= William Nack =

American journalist and author (1941–2018)

- Born: William Louis Nack; February 4, 1941; Chicago, Illinois, U.S.
- Died: April 13, 2018 (aged 77); Washington, D.C., U.S.
- Occupations: Author, journalist, film consultant
- Spouse: Carolyne Starek
- Children: Emily, Rachel, Amy, William
- Writing career
- Pen name: William Nack, Bill Nack
- Genres: Sports, horse racing, boxing
- Notable works: Secretariat: The Making of a Champion (1975), My Turf: Horses, Boxers, Blood Money, and the Sporting Life (2004), Ruffian: A Racetrack Romance (2007)

William Louis Nack (February 4, 1941 – April 13, 2018) was an American journalist and author. He wrote on sports, politics and the environment at Newsday for 11 years before joining the staff of Sports Illustrated in 1978 as an investigative reporter and general feature writer. After leaving S.I. in 2001, Nack freelanced for numerous publications, including GQ and ESPN.com. He also served as an adviser on the made-for-TV-movie Ruffian (2007) and the Disney feature Secretariat (2010).

== Early life ==
Nack was born in Chicago, Illinois. His family moved to the village of Skokie, in 1951. As children, William and his sister, Dee, mucked the stables and groomed the neighbors' horses in nearby Morton Grove. In 1955, they got their own charger, a parade horse with a masking black head atop a pure white body, named The Bandit by Dee. William began riding in horse shows and spent his teenage years with gaited saddle horses, including Wing Commander and Bo Jangles. He kept their photos on opposite walls of his bedroom, in memory of their showdown in the International Amphitheatre in December of that year. In his book Ruffian, Nack wrote that they "went at each other in that hot arena minute by mounting minute and whip over spur, chillingly through the slow gait and the trot, until finally the crowds came bolting to their feet as the mane-flying Commander racked furiously past, his muscular legs pumping him right into history as the greatest five-gaited saddle horse of all time. The howls still sing in my ears."

Nack revered the 1955 Kentucky Derby winner, Swaps, more than any human athlete. He encountered Swaps while hanging over the rail at Washington Park, three months after the Derby victory. "The horse I see in memory now looks tall and radiant," he later observed. "Swaps had a large, luminous brown eye, an exquisitely Aegean head and face that looked chiseled in cameo, and a warm, friendly breath that he held for a moment as your offered hand, cupped downward, rose and drew near him." A week later, Nack saw Swaps again at Washington Park, "lunging through the homestretch like a panther in the gloaming, three in front, his powerful shoulders glinting in the light as he reached his forelegs far in front of him and galloped home in hand." Swaps beat the Traffic Judge and set a new course record of 1:54 3/5. "The clarity of that performance, the decisive finality that I had yearned for and missed in the world of horse shows ruled by fallible and sometimes idiotic judges, had won me to racing as a sport and to the memory of that horse forever." Eleven days after the American Derby, Swaps lost a Washington Park match race to Nashua. Fourteen-year-old William, watching the race on a fifteen-inch Admiral television set, bolted from his house, ran to his neighbor's yard, and vomited on a tree. A week later, he cut a photo of Swaps out of a magazine and stuck it in his wallet. He kept the photo—which he had laminated in 1965—in a multitude of wallets until 1983, when "the last swatch of genuine leather" got pick-pocketed at Madison Square Garden while Nack was covering a prizefight between Roberto Durán and Davey Moore.

In high school, Nack was a groom at Arlington Park. There he worked for trainer Bill Molter, and the star of the stable was Round Table, the Horse of the Year in 1958. In the tack room behind Round Table's stall, Nack practiced his jockey's crouch on a wooden horse. One day he had a friend strike a stirrup with a screwdriver to simulate the bell signaling the opening of a starting gate. "The next thing I know, Round Table's front hooves are on top of the stall," Nack said. "He heard the clang, and he was snorting and rearing, ready to go. I thought I was going to be fired for getting him upset. It was very embarrassing."

Among Nack's most vivid memories of his college days at the University of Illinois was the Saturday morning in May 1963 when former Syracuse University running back Ernie Davis died of leukemia. Nack, an assistant sports editor with the Daily Illini, was alone in the paper's office when the news came across the AP wire. "I remember how the sadness struck me all of a sudden," said Nack, who later wrote about Davis in S.I. "One day Davis had been this robust, powerful athlete who had so much to give, and then he was gone." While attending Illinois, Nack would descend to the underground stacks of the library to read obscure 19th-century accounts of horse breeds. During his senior year, he was sports editor of the Daily Illini under editor-in-chief Roger Ebert. As a grad student, he became the DI's editor-in-chief.

After graduating in 1966, Nack enlisted in the Army, where he was the assistant editor of Infantry Magazine at Fort Benning in Columbus, GA. before becoming a flack for Gen. William C. Westmoreland. His two-year hitch included a tour in Vietnam during the Tet Offensive of 1968. While stationed at Tan Son Nhut Air Base, outside Saigon, he often drowned out the cacophony of exploding mortars and machine gun fire with tapes his mother sent him of the calls of important races. He recalled, "I had left my recorder and tapes under my bed at the Prince Hotel on Tran Hung Dao, and it pleasured me now to imagine some VC colonel lying on his back on my mattress... listening in curious wonder to the call of Damascus winning the Travers by 22."

== Career ==
Nack took his mustering-out pay and moved to Long Island, New York, where he worked as a political and environmental writer for Newsday. During a Christmas party in 1971, he jumped on top of a newsroom desk and recited, chronologically, the names of every Kentucky Derby winner, from the inaugural race in 1875. The editor, a closet horseplayer, asked Nack to cover horse racing for the Sunday paper. Nack accepted. The editor explained that he would have to post the position. All Nack had to do was write a memo stating why he wanted the job. Nack's note said, "After covering politicians for four years, I'd love the chance to cover the whole horse." The following spring, he became the tabloid's official turf writer. During his time on the beat, he witnessed some of the most famous events in thoroughbred racing history, some of which he included in his books.

In 1978, Nack joined the staff of Sports Illustrated, which, in 1974, had excerpted his book on Secretariat. Though his main beat was horse racing, he wrote on a variety of subjects. In 1987 alone, his output included lengthy takeouts on heavyweight boxers Mike Tyson and Leon Spinks, Jan Kemp's damage suit against the University of Georgia, the USFL's lawsuit against the NFL, the New York Mets' Keith Hernandez and the 1987 Anatoly Karpov – Garry Kasparov World Chess Championship, as well as turf topics—e.g., jockey Laffit Pincay. Nack's love of boxing was stoked by his father, whose interest in the sport dated to Jack Dempsey.

At S.I., he wrote profiles of Durán and Sugar Ray Leonard and Sonny Liston, and Lennox Lewis and Larry Holmes and Dempsey, of whose final days as a Broadway restaurateur, he observed: "He greeted and schmoozed and told stories. About riding the rods. About the mining towns. About the day he beat Willard in the roaring Ohio heat. And always the one about the Long Count, under the lights at Soldier Field, and the night he lost but won." Nack's story on the imprisoned middleweight boxer Rubin Carter inspired The Hurricane (1999 film).

Nack's pursuit of reclusive chess grandmaster Bobby Fischer spanned two years. He eventually tracked Fischer down, in 1985, in California. The final months of this search found Nack dressed up like a hobo, gray combed into his hair, loitering around in the Los Angeles public library. He spied Fischer, ducked behind a card catalog, and recalled: "I... leaned my head against the files and said, in a suppressed whisper, 'Oh my God! I found him. I don't believe this. Now what the hell do I do?'"

By the early 1990s, Nack was noticing more and more breakdowns during horse races. His investigation met a wall of silence, until one veterinarian spoke to him off the record: cortisone had become the stables' drug of choice to mask the fatigue of injured horses unfit for racing. Nack exposed the cortisone scandal to the public in his 1993 feature story "The Breaking Point", which told of a filly, So Sly, put down after breaking a leg during a race.

== Works ==
=== Secretariat: The Making of a Champion ===
Secretariat, the Big Red Horse, won the 1973 Kentucky Derby 2½ lengths in front in a time of 1:59.4, breaking the track record of 2:00-flat established by Northern Dancer in 1964. With Ron Turcotte aboard, Secretariat ran each quarter-mile faster than the one before. Two weeks later, Secretariat won the Preakness. Three weeks after that, he won the Belmont to secure the Triple Crown. He ran the fastest 1½ miles on dirt in history, 2:24 flat, which sliced more than two seconds off Gallant Man's stakes record. Nack recalls Secretariat as a "chivalrous prince of a colt who was playful and mischievous---he once grabbed my notebook out of my hand with his teeth, when I was talking to his groom, Eddie Sweat---and stayed the same as a stallion at Claiborne. A kid could have ridden him. The older he got, it seemed, the more of a ham he became, and throughout his life he used to stop and pose whenever he heard the click of a camera."

Red Smith of the New York Times called the 1975 book "the next best thing to watching Secretariat run."

Laura Hillenbrand, author of Seabiscuit: An American Legend (1999), said: "Secretariat is a radiant book, a love song to one of the most enthralling performers in sports history."

=== My Turf: Horses, Boxers, Blood Money, and the Sporting Life ===
Nack took readers through his career at the track, the ring and the stadium. He bypassed many of the thrills of the games themselves for the dramas of the people (and animals) who played them. A profile of Secretariat mixed with an account of Hernandez's loneliness, Fischer's ambivalence toward celebrity, and Liston's awareness of the effect his race has on his reputation. "I have seen two of the pieces in this book (on the breakdown of a filly, and the death of Ruffian) move listeners to tears," wrote Roger Ebert. "If you ~~are~~ know a sports fan who is too intelligent for one of those inane NFL picture books, here is the book you need."

=== Ruffian: A Racetrack Romance ===
From the 15-length victory in her debut on May 22, 1974, through her win in the Coaching Club American Oaks 13 months later, Ruffian set or tied the track record in all eight stakes races she entered. She had won her 10 starts over all by an average of eight lengths (more than 60 feet); for that matter, she had never even trailed at any pole in any race. "I had never seen a 2-year-old do what she was doing," Nack wrote, and "with an insouciance that bordered on the downright cavalier, moving as she pleased with a restrained grace and power and at velocities rarely seen in animals so young. She was, in my experience, sui generis." In a 1975 match race between Ruffian and Kentucky Derby winner Foolish Pleasure at Belmont Park, the licorice-black filly broke down on the backstretch shortly after leaving the starting gate. Nack leaped from a box near the finish line onto the track and began running. All he thought about was getting across the track and the infield to the far side to find out what had happened to Ruffian. "I was in the middle of the track," he said, "when I heard ba-boom, ba-boom, ba-boom. I looked up and froze. Here came Foolish Pleasure, thundering down the stretch toward the finish. I didn't know whether to go forward or back. I had visions of the newspaper headlines: RUFFIAN BREAKS DOWN, NEWSPAPER REPORTER KILLED." Nack avoided Foolish Pleasure and was one of only two reporters—more than 100 covered the race—to view the injured filly close up. Watching the ministrations to a dying filly, Nack wrote, he began to see not "the old romantic notion, shaped by those summers" in Chicago "and all that reading I had done in college," but "a picture framed by cannon bones and inked in darker and more somber hues."

A New York Times reviewer noted: "Some might scoff at describing the demise of a horse (and all she symbolized) as a tragedy, but Nack's requiem — for the animal, for his feelings — summons nothing less."

== Personal life ==
Nack could recite from memory poems by W. B. Yeats, passages from Vladimir Nabokov's novella Pnin and, the final page of F. Scott Fitzgerald's The Great Gatsby (in both English and Spanish). Roger Ebert recalled that "He approached literature like a gourmet. He relished it, savored it, inhaled it, and after memorizing it rolled it on his tongue and spoke it aloud. It was Nack who already knew in the early 1960s when he was a very young man, that Nabokov was perhaps the supreme stylist of modern novelists. He recited to me from Lolita, and Speak, Memory, and Pnin. I was spellbound." Every time Ebert saw Nack, he'd ask him to recite the last lines of The Great Gatsby. His mother, Elizabeth, danced in the mid-1920s in a troupe that was headed by song-and-dance man Pat Rooney and was billed as the Atlantic City Peach. "I'll never forget the first time he asked me not to dance," said onetime S.I. writer Demmie Stathoplos, recalling a distant Kentucky Derby press party. "He just took off. He started whirling, leaping and spinning in the air like some mad dervish. About eight bars into the song I was alone on the dance floor, watching Bill and wondering what to do with my hands." Nack worked as a writer, on-camera host and narrator for the pilot of the TV series Unsettled Scores. The pilot was nominated for an Emmy. He also wrote profiles of major sporting figures for ESPN, serving as an on-camera chronicler and host, upon their death. These also ran, in expanded form, on ESPN.com. His second wife was educator Carolyne Starek. They lived with Milton, their millennium cat, in Washington, D.C. Nack died on April 13, 2018, at the age of 77, from cancer.

== Awards and recognitions ==
=== Eclipse Media Awards ===
Outstanding Magazine Writing

- 1978 - Sports Illustrated
- 1986 - Sports Illustrated
- 1989 - Sports Illustrated
- 1990 - Sports Illustrated

Outstanding News Writing

- 1991 - Sports Illustrated

Outstanding Feature Writing

- 1991 - Sports Illustrated

Writing - Feature/Enterprise

- 2003 - Gentleman's Quarterly

=== Thoroughbred Charities of America ===
- 2003 - Alfred G. Vanderbilt Lifetime Achievement Award

=== Boxing Writers' Association of America ===
- 2004 - A.J. Liebling Award

=== PEN American Center ===
- 2017 - ESPN Lifetime Achievement Award for Literary Sportswriting
