= Pete Axthelm =

American sportswriter and columnist (1943–1991)

- Born: August 27, 1943; New York City, U.S.
- Died: February 2, 1991 (aged 47); Pittsburgh, Pennsylvania, U.S.
- Education: Yale University, 1965
- Occupations: Journalist, sports reporter, columnist, sports commentator
- Spouses: Jill Delaney Axthelm; Andrea Axthelm
- Children: 1 daughter

Pete Axthelm (August 27, 1943 – February 2, 1991) was an American sportswriter and columnist for the New York Herald Tribune, Sports Illustrated, Newsweek and its Inside Sports. During the 1980s, his knowledge of sports and journalistic skill aided him in becoming a sports commentator for The NFL on NBC and NFL Primetime and horse racing on ESPN. While on the pregame telecasts for the NFL in the early 1980s, Axthelm was NBC's answer to CBS' Jimmy "The Greek" Snyder on The NFL Today, providing betting angles to the games. Later in the decade, he would be hired in a similar role by ESPN at the urging of John Walsh, who had been the editor of Inside Sports.

== Early life ==
Born in New York City, Axthelm grew up in Rockville Centre, Long Island, New York with his mother, three siblings, his stepfather and two step-siblings. He attended Hewitt School, a neighborhood public elementary school, and Chaminade high school in Mineola, NY. Axthelm is a 1965 graduate of Yale University, his senior thesis was published in book form by Yale University Press as The Modern Confessional Novel. Axthelm took the Law School Admission Test in his senior year, earning a perfect score, but only did so to please his mother. While at Yale, he had met New York Herald Tribune columnist Jimmy Breslin, who recommended him to his editors; Axthelm was hired by the newspaper and served as its horse racing beat writer before graduating from Yale. Axthelm skipped his Yale graduation to cover races at Belmont Park for the Herald Tribune.

== Early journalism career ==
He went to work for Newsweek in 1968 and covered the Summer Olympics in Mexico City. While in Mexico City, Axthelm played a minor role in the protest by Tommie Smith and John Carlos at the medal ceremony for the 200 meters. Axthelm, who covered the Games wearing a button bearing the letters OPHR (Olympic Project for Human Rights, an organization founded by Harry Edwards), had befriended Smith and Carlos during the Games. Instead of sitting in the press box for the 200 m final, Axthelm was in the stands with their wives. The two sprinters won medals, Smith gold and Carlos bronze, and Axthelm then ran out of the stands to meet them before the medal ceremony. Carlos had worn an OPHR button during his run, but Smith had not; when Smith asked for a button, Axthelm took his button off and handed it to Smith.

In 1970, The City Game, Basketball in New York was published. The book explored one season of the New York Knicks along with players who were legends in neighborhoods of New York but who never played professionally. He is perhaps best remembered for writing The Kid in 1978, a biography of then eighteen-year-old Triple Crown winning jockey Steve Cauthen.

While with Newsweek, Axthelm also worked for Inside Sports, a failed attempt by The Washington Post, then the owner of Newsweek, to compete with Sports Illustrated.

== Later life and death ==
Axthelm was a longtime heavy drinker, which eventually developed into alcoholism. By the late 1980s, his drinking had seriously affected both his health and the quality of his work. In a 2021 story for Sports Illustrated, his daughter Megan Axthelm Brown said about this period, "He was never falling-down drunk or face-planting in the birthday cake, but more and more, he would be slurring his words." According to multiple accounts, Axthelm's drinking affected his ESPN work to the point that Walsh gave him an ultimatum, telling him that his job was in jeopardy if he didn't stop drinking. Axthelm responded, "Yeah, my daughter says the same thing." Jon Wertheim, author of the 2021 SI story, would write, "Then and there Walsh realized the hopelessness. If he’s not going to quit for his own daughter, he sure as hell ain’t quitting for me." (emphasis in original) Axthelm also had numerous extramarital affairs, with Megan saying "He had a girlfriend in every port." He and his first wife Jill split when Megan was young, but remained friends, and did not formally divorce until about 20 years later.

Axthelm eventually developed acute hepatitis and died of liver failure on February 2, 1991, at the age of 47. At the time of his death, he was awaiting a liver transplant at Presbyterian Hospital in Pittsburgh, and was survived by his second wife Andrea and daughter.

== Awards ==
- 1975 Penney-Missouri Award

== Works ==
- The City Game, Harper's Magazine Press, New York, 1970 (ISBN 0-8032-5934-4)
- The Modern Confessional Novel (Yale University Press, 1967)
- Tennis Observed: The U.S.L.T.A. Men's Singles Champions, 1881–1966 with William F. Talbert (Barre Publishers, 1967)
- The Kid, a portrait of the racing prodigy Steve Cauthen (Bantam, 1978)
