= Donna Barton Brothers =

American jockey

Personal information
- Born: April 20, 1966 (age 60) Alamogordo, New Mexico
- Occupation: Jockey

Horse racing career
- Sport: Horse racing
- Career wins: 1,130

Major racing wins
- Golden Rod Stakes (1994); Ack Ack Handicap (1994); Phoenix Stakes (1994); Churchill Downs Debutante Stakes (1995); Edgewood Stakes (1995, 1997); Kentucky Juvenile Stakes (1995); Sapling Stakes (1995); Schuylerville Stakes (1995); Thoroughbred Club of America Stakes (1995); Gardenia Stakes (1996); Kentucky Cup Juvenile Stakes (1996); Louisville Handicap (1996); Risen Star Stakes (1997)

Significant horses
- Boston Harbor, Golden Attraction

Donna Barton Brothers (born April 20, 1966, in Alamogordo, New Mexico) is a former jockey who won over 1,100 horse races and now covers horse racing and other equestrian sports for NBC Sports. She is probably most recognizable for her interviews with the winning jockeys from horseback after the Triple Crown and Breeders' Cup races. She is one of the most decorated female jockeys of her time, retiring in 1998 with 1,130 career wins. Brothers hails from a family of riders, including both of her siblings, as well as her mother who was, in 1969, one of the first women to be licensed as a jockey. She resides in Louisville, Kentucky and Saratoga Springs, New York.

== Career ==
Donna Brothers's mother, Patti Barton, was a jockey, as were her brother and sister. Barton (now Brothers) began her professional career as a jockey in 1987. She was one of D. Wayne Lukas 's first-call jockeys in the 1990s and rode numerous stakes winners, at the time making her the second leading money-earner of all time among female Thoroughbred jockeys.

She won 1,130 races in her career. In terms of earnings, Barton still ranks fourth among female jockeys even though she retired in 1998.

Barton retired in 1998, married trainer Frank Brothers, and then became involved in television broadcasting. Brothers started as an interviewer at the Fair Grounds Race Course in New Orleans, then as an on-air racing analyst for Churchill Downs, where she joined their other analyst, Mike Battaglia. She was "discovered" by NBC Sports in 2000 when NBC was at Churchill Downs for observation in advance of assuming Derby coverage from ABC in 2001. She began working for NBC that fall doing their Breeders' Cup coverage as their only reporter on horseback. She attended University of Louisville from 2002 to 2005 but became too busy with reporting duties for NBC Sports and other networks and moved to full-time work as a reporter and racing analyst in 2005.

Brothers served as a racing analyst for Churchill Downs' "Paddock Preview" show from April 1999 to November 2002. Additionally, Brothers did on-location work for TVG, a horseracing network, providing on-site reports from both Churchill Downs and the Fair Grounds from November 1999 to November 2002. She also covered Keeneland's Spring and Fall meets for TVG from 2009 to 2016.

At Triple Crown races, Brothers positions herself near the starting gate for the start of the race. Then, for the Kentucky Derby, she rides around the track backward (along the outside rail), passing the horses who are racing, thus getting in position to be the first to interview the winning jockey. For the Preakness and Belmont Stakes she is also positioned behind the starting gate for the start but then follows the field into the first turn and waits for the winner on the backstretch.

Brothers has also covered the Breeders' Cup, PBR Professional Bull Riders, the Hambletonian Stakes, the World Equestrian Games, the Kentucky Three Day Eventing show, and many other horse races for NBC Sports.

She released the book "Inside Track: Inside Guide to Horse Racing" in 2011. The book was revised and released in its second edition in 2014 and its third edition in 2020.
