= Kenny Rice =

American sports announcer (born 1956)

- Born: July 28, 1956 (age 69); McDowell, Kentucky, U.S.
- Occupation: Sportscaster

Kenny Rice (born July 28, 1956) is an American sportscaster known nationally for his horse racing reporting with NBC and MMA coverage for HDNet.

== Biography ==
Kenny Rice was born July 28, 1956, in McDowell, Floyd County, Kentucky. He grew up in the town of Eastern, and began his career as a disc jockey while in high school for WDOC in Prestonsburg, Kentucky. After graduating from the University of Kentucky in 1980, he became the Sports Director for WTVQ TV in Lexington.

== Professional career ==
=== ESPN ===
A national "stringer" in the early days of ESPN's SportsCenter, Rice filed reports from 1982 to 1990 and was a correspondent for Down the Stretch (1982–1985) and Wire to Wire (1998–2005). Rice was host and reporter for horse racing including Breakfast at the Kentucky Derby and 2Day at the Races (1997–2006). He was an on-site co-host of college basketball's Midnight Madness for the debut of ESPNU (2005). He has also been a frequent contributor of Horse Racing coverage to the ESPN web site.

=== NBC ===
Since 1999, Rice has covered horse racing, reporting on the Kentucky Derby, Preakness Stakes, Breeders' Cup and Belmont Stakes. He's worked two Summer Olympics; boxing reporter (2004) and host of Equestrian Competition (2008). In addition, Rice covered the U.S. Olympic Trials in both Triathlon (Host) and Equestrian (Reporter) and has reported on the NFL for NBC's Football Night in America. He did play by play of Track and Field, Rugby, and Basketball at the 2008 Paralympic Games for NBC's Universal Sports with his track calls used in an NBC documentary of the games. He called the Pro Bull Riders World Finals ('05, '07). Since 2008 he has been the host of the Hambletonian Harness race.

=== NBCSN ===
Rice has been a co-commentator alongside former MMA fighter Bas Rutten for the World Series of Fighting since WSOF 5 was broadcast on NBCSN on September 14, 2013.

=== HDNet ===
Rice has worked for Mark Cuban's HDNet since 2003 and hosts the popular Inside MMA with legendary champion Bas Rutten (they also announced for the short-lived IFL on Fox Sports Net). Rice called play by play of the inaugural United Football League 2009 season with Paul Maguire. His college football play by play includes the game, Harvard VS. Yale and the Monon Bell Game between Wabash College and DePauw, as well as college basketball calls of the John R. Wooden Classic, Legends Classic and College Basketball Invitational. Rice worked with Rex Chapman calling Pac-10, Missouri Valley Conference, Horizon League and West Coast Conference basketball games from 2003 to 2005. He has also done boxing and MMA play by play and hosted horse racing coverage including the Santa Anita Derby.

=== Other ===
Since 2008 Rice has hosted what is considered by thoroughbred racing enthusiasts racing's biggest night, The Eclipse Awards. He also appeared in the 2011 documentary film When Happy Met Froggie.

== Awards ==
- 2007-Honored upon a visit to the Kentucky Senate
- 1996-Eclipse Award for Outstanding Local Television Achievement.
- 1996- Youngest recipient of the Charles W. Engelhard award for Lifetime Contribution to the Kentucky Thoroughbred Industry.
- 1984-Won the First Hervey Award given for Outstanding TV Reporting of Harness Racing.
