= Trevor Denman =

South African American sportscaster (born 1952)

- Born: September 24, 1952 (age 73); Germiston, Gauteng, South Africa
- Awards: Special Eclipse Award for Career Excellence (2026)
- Sports commentary career
- Sport: Thoroughbred horse racing

Trevor Denman (born 24 September 1952) is a South African former sportscaster and public-address announcer specializing in Thoroughbred horse racing, primarily at racetracks in the United States.

== Background ==
Denman was born in Germiston, Gauteng, South Africa. A part-time jockey and exercise rider, he started as a race caller in his native South Africa in 1971 at age 18. He called two races at Santa Anita Park in 1983 and was hired that year as the announcer of the track's Oak Tree meet. He was named Santa Anita's permanent announcer the following year. He has also called races at Del Mar Racetrack, Pimlico Race Course, Laurel Park Racecourse, Atlantic City Race Course, and Hollywood Park Racetrack.

Denman retired from calling races at Santa Anita in December 2015, saying in a statement that it was "time to stop counting dollars and start counting the stars." He continued to call races at Del Mar until he scaled his duties back beginning in 2020 during the COVID-19 pandemic; Larry Collmus and John Lies filled in for Denman on a part-time basis. Denman called his final race at Del Mar in September 2024, retiring from that role in March 2025.

In January 2026, it was announced that Denman would receive a special Eclipse Award for Career Excellence.

== Style ==
He is best known for the phrase "And away they go...", spoken as the horses emerge from the starting gate. Some other phrases that Denman has coined are popular with racing fans, such as "scraping the paint", used to describe a horse who is saving ground (running very close to the inner rail). Another is "they would need to sprout wings to catch ______ ..." when a horse is leading by an insurmountable margin in the stretch. A similar phrase used in the same context is "he's [or she's] out here moving like a winner..." "______ looks like he jumped in at the quarter pole..." is used when a horse comes from far back and is running so fast as to give the impression that he has only just started to run. Finally, another well known Denman phrase is, "_________ is coming like an express train!" This phrase is used when a horse is running right by leading horses in the stretch. He owns a three-year-old filly in South Africa, named Top Twenty, trained by Paul Lafferty.

== Breeders' Cup ==
Denman was the voice of the Breeders' Cup when it aired on ESPN. He replaced Tom Durkin, who had been the race caller since the inception.

Denman called the 2009 Breeders' Cup Classic won by the undefeated Zenyatta, in what he described as the best race call of his career.

== Other media ==
In the 1989 comedy movie Let It Ride starring Richard Dreyfuss and Teri Garr, Denman is the track announcer that is heard in many of the racetrack scenes that took place at Hialeah Park in Hialeah, Florida. Trevor Denman was also the announcer in the movie Racing Stripes during the race.

Denman was the unnamed race announcer in the animated television show The Simpsons episode #239, aired originally in February 2000, entitled Saddlesore Galactica. He had a recurring role in the HBO series Luck, in his real-life job at Santa Anita.

Denman also makes an appearance in a Verizon commercial.
