= Chris Fowler =

American sportscaster (born 1962)

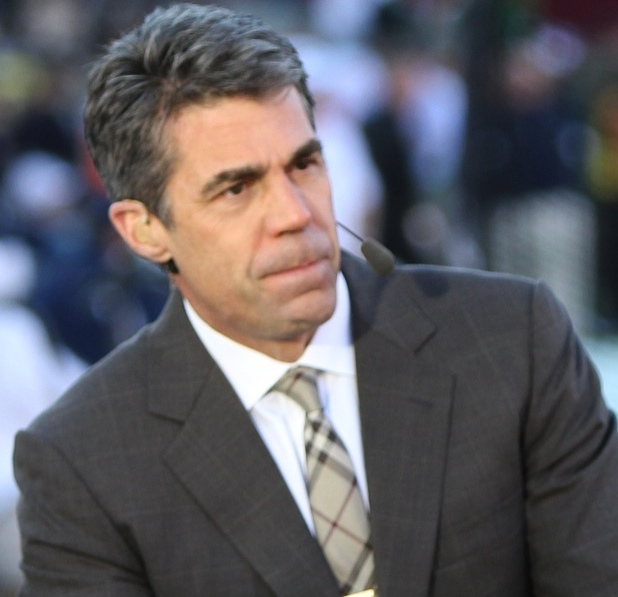
- Fowler in 2012
- Born: Christopher Brady Fowler; August 23, 1962 (age 64); Colorado, U.S.
- Education: University of Colorado Boulder
- Years active: 1982–present
- Spouse: Jennifer Dempster
- Sports commentary career
- Genre: Play-by-play
- Sports: College football NFL; Soccer; Tennis
- Employer: The Walt Disney Company via ESPN Inc. including ABC

Christopher Brady Fowler (born August 23, 1962) is an American sports sportscaster for ESPN and ABC, who serves as the play-by-play announcer for Saturday Night Football, tennis coverage and previously Monday Night Football.

He is also known for his work on College GameDay, which he hosted from 1990 to 2014, and for college football.

In 2014, he replaced Brent Musburger as the play-by-play announcer for Saturday Night Football on ABC, having him on ESPN's top announcing team alongside fellow College Gameday's Kirk Herbstreit; this meant he would also be selected to announce one of the two College Football Playoff semifinal games and the College Football Playoff National Championship.

== Early life and education ==
Fowler was born in the Denver area and grew up in Rockford, Illinois and State College, Pennsylvania, where his father, Knox, was a theater professor at Penn State University. When he was a teenager, his family relocated to Colorado Springs, Colorado where he graduated from General William J. Palmer High School in 1980.

Fowler graduated from the University of Colorado in 1985 with a Bachelor of Science degree. While a student, Fowler served as a producer and co-host for a weekly magazine program aired over a cable television system in Boulder, Colorado from 1983 to 1985. He also spent two years as sports director at KAIR-AM, the university's radio station. From 1982 to 1984, he covered high school sports for the Rocky Mountain News.

== Career ==
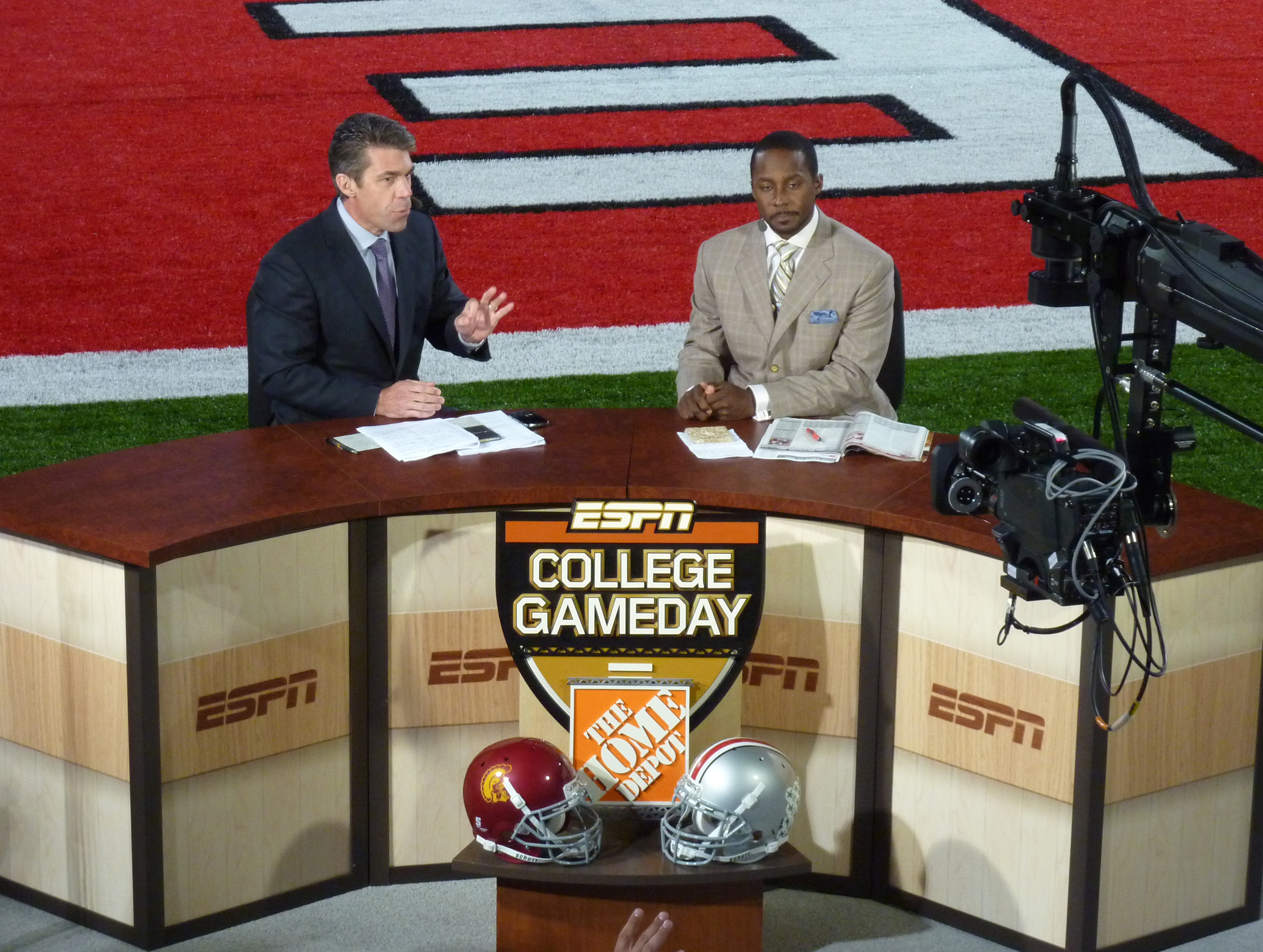
Fowler and Desmond Howard handling post-game coverage for College GameDay in 2009

Prior to joining ESPN, Fowler spent nearly two years at KCNC-TV, then the NBC affiliate in Denver, as a production assistant, a producer/writer and as a sports reporter. In 1984, he worked for several months at KMGH-TV in the same city as an intern in the sports department.

Fowler joined ESPN in July 1986 as the host/reporter of Scholastic Sports America, a stint which lasted two years. In 1988, he began serving as a college football sideline reporter for two seasons. While on the college football beat, Fowler conducted an exclusive interview with former star University of Oklahoma quarterback Charles Thompson, who was in prison at the time on drug charges.

He began as host of the College GameDay football road show in 1990 and expanded to ESPN's other Saturday college football segments in 1991.

After Charles Woodson won the 1997 Heisman Trophy over Tennessee's Peyton Manning, Tennessee fans blamed ESPN and in particular, Fowler, who had emceed the award ceremony and handed the trophy to Woodson. Fowler received abuse from Tennessee fans (and he described the reaction as "trailer park frenzy" on a radio show), and GameDay avoided shooting on the Tennessee campus for several years that followed.

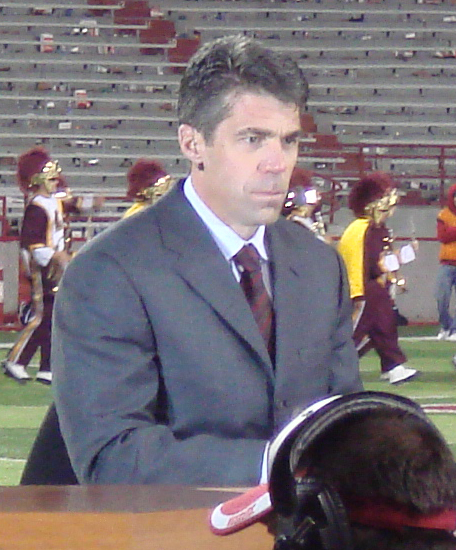
Fowler in 2007

In February 2015, ESPN announced Rece Davis will take over for Fowler as host of GameDay, but that Fowler will continue his play-by-play role on Saturday Night Football on ABC and College Football Playoff games, and as host of the annual Heisman Trophy presentations.

Until 2006, he was also the lead studio host of ESPN College Basketball. Fowler has also worked with ESPN's Summer X Games from 1995 to 2000 and the Winter X Games from 1998 to 2000 as well as horse racing broadcasts, including the Breeders Cup World Thoroughbred Championship on ESPN. In addition, he serves as the head play-by-play for tennis tournaments broadcast on ESPN, including Wimbledon, Australian Open, French Open and for the US Open being broadcast for the first year in 2009 on ESPN. In 2010, he anchored, along with Mike Tirico, ESPN's and ABC's month-long coverage of the 2010 FIFA World Cup.

In 2020, Fowler called the first game of the Monday Night Football Kickoff Week doubleheader alongside Kirk Herbstreit and Maria Taylor. They later called the early game of ESPN's Week 18 Saturday doubleheader with Laura Rutledge a year later. After Herbstreit signed with Prime Video to call Thursday Night Football, Fowler was replaced by Steve Levy on the #2 team for the 2022 season, but was re-inserted into that role a year later. He now works with Louis Riddick, Dan Orlovsky, Katie George, and Peter Schrager on weeks when ESPN has two games. As part of his NFL assignments, Fowler also calls the Super Bowl for ESPN Australia.

He was also the host of the ESPN Classic show SportsCentury.

Along with fellow College GameDay hosts Lee Corso and Desmond Howard, in 2007 Fowler broadcast College Gameday from Williams College for its homecoming game against Amherst College, the first and only time College GameDay has covered a Division III game. Fowler has called the experience, and Williams' tradition of "The Walk" up Spring Street following a victory over Amherst, "one of the best traditions in college football." Fowler joined the Williams football players in St. Pierre barbershop following the game to celebrate Williams' victory.

In 2021, Fowler hosted the Seattle Kraken expansion draft on ESPN, in the first NHL broadcast on the network since 2004. During the broadcast, Fowler accidentally referred to the Carolina Hurricanes as the "Carolina Panthers", an error that both teams would reference on Twitter (with the Panthers changing its profile picture to use the Hurricanes' logo colored in the Panthers' blue, and the Hurricanes changing their profile picture to a poorly drawn picture of a panther).

On February 22, 2024, Fowler announced on X (formerly Twitter) that he would be a play-by-play voice on the upcoming EA Sports College Football 25, eventually released in July that year. He announced in April 2025 that he would reprise that role in EA Sports College Football 26.

== Personal life ==
Fowler is married to former fitness model/instructor Jennifer Dempster, who appeared on ESPN in the 1990s on the show BodyShaping.

Sporting positions
Preceded by Bob Carpenter	ESPN College GameDay host 1990–2014	Succeeded by Rece Davis
