= Jeannine Edwards =

American sportscaster

- Born: March 12, 1964 (age 62); Tenafly, New Jersey
- Years active: 1993–2017
- Spouse: Glenn Spencer (m. 2013)
- Sports commentary career
- Genres: Color analyst, Sideline reporter
- Sports: College football, College basketball, Horse racing

Jeannine Edwards (born March 12, 1964) is a former ESPN/ABC sportscaster focusing on college football, college basketball and horse racing.

== Early career ==
Edwards began a career with racehorses that spanned 10 years as an exercise rider, apprentice jockey, and trainer in New York and New Jersey.

After moving to Maryland in 1993, Edwards began TV work as an in-house host at the Pimlico and Laurel Park race courses.

== ESPN and ABC ==
In 1995 Edwards was selected as an analyst for a new ESPN studio show: The "National Best 7". The show morphed into "2Day at the Races" and ran for five years.

During that time, Edwards continued working part-time for the Maryland tracks. Shortly thereafter she began reporting full-time for ESPN's remote racing telecasts as well as branching out into sideline reporting for the network's College Football and Basketball coverage. Edwards also became a general assignment reporter on ESPN's SportsCenter in 2009.

With her background in horse racing, Edwards served as the senior reporter for all of ESPN and ABC's live horse racing series, including the Breeders' Cup, Dubai World Cup and extensive Triple Crown coverage.

Edwards was a familiar face on SportsCenter, ESPN’s flagship news and highlights program covering College Football, the NFL, College Basketball, and MLB. Her skill in reporting major stories and breaking news, providing behind-the-scenes coverage through creative live shots, made her a regular on the network.

Edwards also worked the football sidelines for ABC and ESPN as part of the networks’ popular and highly-rated Saturday College Football programming. She was ESPN's Atlantic Coast Conference (ACC) reporter for Men's College Basketball as well as a primary voice covering the NCAA Tournament and Final Four. Additionally, Edwards subbed as a fill-in host for studio shows such as First Take and NFL Live.

== Awards and notable appearances ==
Edwards was recognized for her outstanding reporting for ESPN, ABC News and Good Morning America on the injury and subsequent death of Kentucky Derby winner Barbaro. Edwards was asked to write the forward to the book "Greatness and Goodness: Barbaro And His Legacy".

Edwards and the ESPN horse racing team won three consecutive Eclipse® Awards (2009, 2010, and 2011) for Outstanding Live Telecasts, as well as two Emmy® nominations.

The National Thoroughbred Racing Association selected Jeannine as the first female to host the Eclipse Awards ceremony; she hosted for a record 7 straight years.

In June 2012, Edwards was identified by The Los Angeles Daily News as one of "The 40 Women Who Raised the Bar in Sports Media".

In 2018, Edwards received the Preakness Special Award of Merit at the Alibi Breakfast at Pimlico Race Course. The Special Award of Merit is given to those who have made a positive impact on the racing industry. Previous recipients have been Jim McKay, D. Wayne Lukas, Dr. Dean Richardson and Edgar Prado, Team American Pharoah, Jerry Bailey and King Leatherbury.

== Post-retirement ==
Edwards stepped away from television at the end of December 2017 after a 22-year career at ESPN. Edwards was consistently rated among the most respected female sportscasters in the business.

Since 2022 Edwards has been serving as a VIP ambassador and handicapper for the Breeders' Cup World Thoroughbred Championships.

== Personal life ==
Native of Tenafly, NJ; graduated from Immaculate Heart Academy in Washington Township NJ in 1982.

In 2013 Edwards made national news when she married then-Oklahoma State Defensive Coordinator Glenn Spencer. The two had met after Edwards did a sideline story about the death of Spencer's first wife.
