= Hank Goldberg =

American broadcast personality (1940–2022)

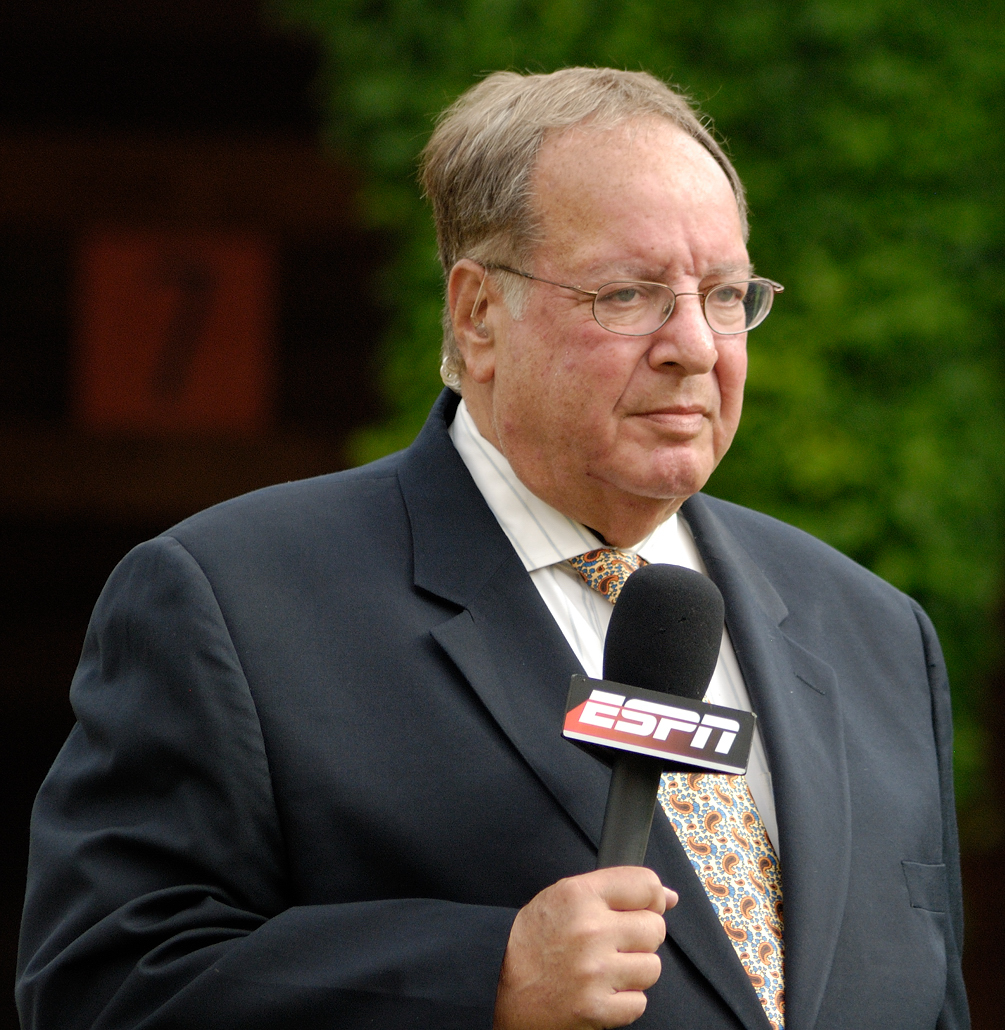
- Goldberg in 2009
- Born: Henry Edward Goldberg; July 4, 1940; Newark, New Jersey, U.S.
- Died: July 4, 2022 (aged 82); Las Vegas, Nevada, U.S.
- Education: New York University
- Occupation: Sports commentator
- Years active: 1970s–2022
- Sports commentary career
- Team: Miami Dolphins (1978–1992)
- Genres: Color commentary; handicapping
- Sports: Football; horse racing

Henry Edward Goldberg (July 4, 1940 – July 4, 2022) was an American sports radio and television personality based in Miami, Florida. He was the radio color commentator for the Miami Dolphins from 1978 to 1992. He also worked at WIOD and WTVJ, before joining ESPN in 1993, shortly after ESPN2 and ESPN Radio were established. He specialized in providing handicapping analysis for National Football League (NFL) games and horse racing.

== Early life ==
Goldberg was born in Newark, New Jersey, on July 4, 1940. His father, Hy, worked as a sportswriter for the Newark Evening News for over four decades and was honored as the state's sportswriter of the year on five occasions; his mother was Sadie. Throughout his childhood, he travelled annually with his father to Florida for spring training with the New York Yankees, where he served as a batboy and became friends with Joe DiMaggio. Goldberg studied at Duke University but transferred to New York University and graduated there. He was a member of the US Army Reserve and worked in Manhattan in advertising.

== Career ==
Goldberg relocated to Miami in 1966. He first worked in advertising, as well as in the public relations department of the Miami Dolphins. He was subsequently invited by Jimmy Snyder during the mid-1970s to be his ghostwriter for his nationally syndicated column. He also put together subject matter for Snyder's contributions to The NFL Today, with the assistance of Al Davis.

After working under Snyder for four years, Goldberg became the Dolphins radio color commentator in 1978. He also took over as sports talk show host with WIOD that same year after being recommended to the position by Larry King, who departed from both posts in order to start the Larry King Show. Goldberg subsequently joined WTVJ as a sports commentator in 1983. During this time, he gained the monikers of "The Hammer" and "Hammerin’ Hank" because he would bang a gavel on the desk when he argued with his co-host. He simultaneously held the aforementioned three positions until 1992, when he was dismissed from WIOD for publicly disregarding his program director's instructions. He consequently joined WQAM – a rival station that was floundering at the time – and ultimately surpassed WIOD in the ratings. He started working for ESPN the following year, shortly after ESPN2 and ESPN Radio were launched. He appeared on NFL Countdown to provide handicapping analysis for NFL games, and collaborated with Tony Bruno and Keith Olbermann three times a week for the latter.

Goldberg worked at WQAM until December 31, 2007, when his contract expired. He had earlier rejected an offer for a new contract that would have resulted in a 60 percent salary reduction. He moved to Las Vegas in July 2018, two months after the US Supreme Court struck down the federal law that criminalized sports betting. He went on to work for CBS Sports HQ and CBS SportsLine.com, in addition to ESPN's Daily Wager. He made his final appearance on ESPN in May 2022, when he was interviewed over the phone from the Kentucky Derby. He published his final picks one month later for the Belmont Stakes.

== Personal life ==
Goldberg remained a lifelong bachelor and never married. He dated Katie Couric when she was working at WTVJ with him. He maintained his friendship with Joe DiMaggio until the latter's death, frequently playing golf with him. Goldberg resided in Miami for 52 years until 2018, when he moved to Las Vegas.

Goldberg was diagnosed with kidney failure caused by diabetes in 2015, and his right leg was eventually amputated below the knee in October 2021. He died at his home in Las Vegas on July 4, 2022, his 82nd birthday.
