= Thoroughbred Racing on ESPN =

ESPN and ESPN2's coverage of Thoroughbred racing consisted of NTRA Racing to the Kentucky Derby., Road To The World Thoroughbred Championships/NTRA Racing to the Breeders' Cup, a series of prep races for the Breeders' Cup World Thoroughbred Championships, the post position draw for the Kentucky Derby and Preakness Stakes, the Kentucky Derby and Belmont Stakes undercard races, the Kentucky Oaks and Black-Eyed Susan Stakes, NTRA 2Day At the Races, Racing Across America, the Preakness undercard races, the Eclipse Awards show, and Long John Silver's Wire to Wire (previously known as RaceHorse Digest), a weekly thoroughbred racing magazine show. They also had Triple Crown morning shows such as Breakfast at Churchill Downs and Breakfast at Pimlico. ESPN also broadcast NTRA Super Saturdays as well.

From 2006 to 2011, ESPN broadcast the Breeders' Cup. ESPN on ABC also broadcast a portion of the Breeders' Cup.

== NTRA Racing to the Kentucky Derby ==
NTRA Racing to the Kentucky Derby was a series of races produced by NTRA Productions that air on ESPN or ESPN2. These networks currently air seven races under the Racing to the Kentucky Derby banner. They are the Lane's End Stakes, Rushaway Stakes, Florida Derby, Swale Stakes, Arkansas Derby, Blue Grass Stakes, and Lexington Stakes. Previous races broadcast on ESPN as part of NTRA Racing to the Kentucky Derby include the Fountain of Youth Classic, Louisiana Derby, El Camino Real Derby, Gotham Stakes, UAE Derby, Santa Anita Derby, Illinois Derby, Wood Memorial, Holy Bull Stakes, Hutcheson Stakes, and Federico Tesio Stakes.

== Personalities ==
Among ESPN's regulars on its horse racing telecasts were hosts Chris Lincoln, Chris Fowler, Joe Tessitore and Kenny Mayne, along with analysts Charlsie Cantey, Dave Johnson, Bob Neumeier, Jerry D. Bailey and Randy Moss, handicapper Hank Goldberg and reporters Lesley Visser, Jeannine Edwards and Jay Privman.
