= List of sports announcers =

This is a list of sports announcers and sports commentators. Those television and radio networks included must have national exposure, not regional.

== American football ==
- Troy Aikman – Fox 2001–2021, ESPN 2022–present
- Kenny Albert – Fox 1994–present
- Jason Bell – BBC Sport 2015–2022, ITV Sport 2022–2025, Sky Sports 2025–present
- Chris Berman – ESPN 1985–present
- Allen Bestwick – ESPN 2014–2017
- Rocky Boiman – BBC Radio 5 Live 2012–13 & 2015–2017, Absolute Radio 2013–2014
- Terry Bradshaw – CBS 1984–1994, Fox 1994–present
- Greg Brady – BBC Radio 5 Live 2006–13, Talksport 2017–present
- Tom Brady – Fox 2024–present
- Tim Brant – ABC 1982–present
- James Brown – Fox 1994–2006, CBS 2006–present, Showtime 2008–2022
- Jack Buck – CBS 1964–96
- Joe Buck – Fox 1994–97, 2001–2021, ESPN 2022–present
- Mike Carlson – Channel 5 1997–2009, BBC Sport 2009–13 & 2015–2022, Channel 4 2010–2015, Talksport 2017–present
- Mark Chapman – BBC Sport 2012–13 & 2015–2021
- Cris Collinsworth – HBO 1989–2008, NBC 1990–98, NBC 2006–present, Fox 1998–2006, NFL Network 2006–08, Showtime 2008–present
- Nat Coombs – Channel 5 2006–2009, Channel 4 2012–15, BBC Sport 2015–2022, Talksport 2017–present
- Lee Corso – ESPN 1987–2025
- Howard Cosell – ESPN/ABC 1970–1983
- David Croft – BBC Radio 5 Live 2007
- Randy Cross – CBS 1989–1993, 1998–present, NBC 1994–97
- Al DeRogatis – NBC 1966–1975
- Dan Dierdorf – CBS 1985–1986, 1999–2014, ABC 1987–1999
- Tony Dungy – NBC 2009–2025
- Dick Enberg – NBC 1975–1999, CBS 2000–09
- Boomer Esiason – ESPN/ABC 1998–2000, Fox Sports Net 2001, CBS 2002–2023
- Darren Fletcher – BBC Radio 5 Live 2011–13 & 2015–present, Absolute Radio 2013–2014, BBC Sport 2012–13, ITV Sport 2022–2025
- Dan Fouts – CBS 1988–1993, 2008–present, ESPN/ABC 1997–2008
- Chris Fowler – ESPN/ABC, ESPN/ABC, ABC 1986–present
- Frank Gifford – CBS 1965–70, ABC 1971–99
- Jerry Glanville – Fox 1994–98, CBS 1999–2003
- Curt Gowdy – ABC 1960–1964, 1982–1983, NBC 1965–79
- Jon Gruden – ESPN/ABC 2009–2017
- Kevin Harlan – Fox 1994–97, CBS 1998–present
- Rodney Harrison – NBC 2009–present
- Kirk Herbstreit – ESPN/ABC, ESPN/ABC, ABC 1996–present
- Jake Humphrey – BBC Sport 2008–2011
- Gary Imlach – Channel 4 1987–1997, ITV Sport 2005–2008, Channel 4 2010
- Keith Jackson – ABC 1966–2006
- Ron Jaworski – ESPN/ABC 2007–2011
- Jimmy Johnson – Fox 1994–95, 2002–present
- Daryl Johnston – Fox 2001–present
- Vernon Kay – Channel 4 2013–15
- Danny Kelly – Channel 4 2011
- Howie Long – Fox 1994–present
- Bill Maas – Fox 1995–2005
- John Madden – CBS 1981–1994, Fox 1994–2002, ABC 2002–06, NBC 2006–09
- Paul Maguire – NBC 1976–79, 1988–97, ESPN 1998–2005
- Dan Marino – CBS 2002–present
- Curt Menefee – Fox 2006–present
- Don Meredith – ABC 1970–73, 1977–85, NBC 1974–76
- Al Michaels – ABC 1986–2006, NBC 2006–present
- Matt Millen – CBS 1992–1993, Fox 1994–2001
- Colin Murray – Channel 5 2004–2006, Channel 4 2013–14
- Brent Musburger – CBS 1973–1990, ESPN, ABC 1990–2016
- Jim Nantz – CBS 1985–present
- Merlin Olsen – NBC 1977–1989, CBS 1990–1991
- Mike Patrick – ESPN 1987–present
- Jonathan Pearce – BBC Radio 5 Live 2004
- Matt Roberts – BBC Sport 2009–2013
- Tony Romo – CBS 2017–present
- Sam Rosen – Fox 1996–present
- Ryan Ruocco – ESPN Radio 2013–present
- Shannon Sharpe – CBS 2004–2014
- Phil Simms – ESPN 1994–1995, NBC 1995–1998, CBS 1998–2023
- Michael Strahan – Fox 2008–present
- Pat Summerall – CBS 1964–1994, Fox 1994–2002, 2006–2010
- Joe Theismann – ABC 1985, Fox 1986–1987, ESPN 1988–2006, NFL Network 2009–present
- Mike Tirico – ESPN/ABC 2006–2015, NBC 2016–2022, Prime Video 2022-present
- Sean Wheelock – BBC Radio 5 Live 2004–2006
- Arlo White – BBC Radio 5 Live 2005–2010

== Association football ==
- Clive Allen – Sky Sports 1998–2001, ITV Sport 2001–2007, BBC Radio 5 Live 2012–present
- George Allison – BBC Radio 1927–?
- Malcolm Allison – ITV Sport 1970–1974
- Eamonn Andrews – BBC Radio 1950–1962, ITV Sport 1965–1968
- Jimmy Armfield – BBC Radio 1978–2017
- Dean Ashton – BT Sport 2013–2023, ITV Sport 2014–present, talksport 2018–present, Quest 2018–2022
- Ron Atkinson – ITV Sport 1980–2004
- John Barnes – ITV Sport 1996–2003, Channel 5 2003–2008, ESPN UK 2010–2013, Al Jazeera/Bein Sports 2013–present, Sky Sports 2020–present
- Wally Barnes – BBC Sport 1956–1975
- David Basheer – SBS 2013–present
- Peter Beagrie – Sky Sports 2006–2017
- James Beattie – BT Sport 2013–2015, BBC Sport 2015
- Jim Beglin – ITV Sport 1996–2013, ESPN UK 2012–2013, RTÉ Sport 2000–present, BT Sport 2013–present, BBC Radio 5 Live 2013–present
- George Best – Sky Sports 1998–2005, TV3 2003–2004
- Manish Bhasin – BBC Sport 2004–present, Premier League TV 2015–present
- Georgie Bingham – Sky Sports 2004–2007, ESPN 2007–2010, Talksport 2010–2020
- Luther Blissett – Channel 4 1996–2002, Bravo 2003–2005
- Packie Bonner – TV3 Ireland 2001–2004
- Ned Boulting – ITV Sport 2001–present
- Steve Bower – talksport 2000–2002, Setanta Sports 2007–2009, ESPN UK 2009–2013, BBC Sport 2009–present, Channel 5 2010, ITV Sport 2011–2012, Premier Sport 2010–2013, BT Sport 2013–present, NBC 2014–present, Channel 4 2017 & 2022-2024
- Peter Brackley – BBC Radio 1979–1982, ITV Sport 1982–1988, 1992–2002, 2006, Sky Sports 1989–1992, Eurosport 1988–1991, 2002–2005 Channel 4 1992–2002, Bravo 2005–2006, BBC Sport 2009–2011
- Liam Brady – BBC Sport 1990–1994, RTÉ Sport 1998–2008 & 2010–2023
- Alan Brazil – Sky Sports 1996–2001, Talksport 2000–present
- Mark Bright – BBC Sport/BBC Radio 5 Live 1999–2013, Eurosport 2013, Absolute Radio 2013–2016
- Trevor Brooking – BBC Sport/BBC Radio 1984–2003
- Simon Brotherton – BBC Radio 5 Live 1993–present, BBC Sport 1999–present, BT Sport 2013–present
- Craig Burley – Setanta Sports 2007–2009, ESPN 2009–2013, BBC Radio 5 Live 2009–present, ITV Sport 2010–2012
- Terry Butcher – BBC Radio 5 Live 1996–2010
- Bryon Butler – BBC Radio c. 1960–1968 as reporter; 1968–1991 as correspondent and commentator; 1991–1997 as reporter
- Tim Caple – Eurosport 1996–present
- Clarke Carlisle – ITV Sport 2013–2014, Absolute Radio 2013–2016
- Shaiju Damodaran – Star Sports 2014–present, Sony Ten 2018
- Jamie Carragher – ITV Sport 2012, Sky Sports 2013–present
- Tony Cascarino – talkSport 2002–2007, TV3 Ireland 2009–present
- Kelly Cates – talkSport 2006–2008, Setanta Sports 2007–2009, ESPN UK 2009–2013, ITV Sport 2010–2013, BBC Radio 5 Live 2013–present, Channel 5 2015–2016, Sky Sports 2016–present, BBC Sport 2025-
- Ed Chamberlin – Sky Sports 2000–2016
- Jon Champion – BBC Radio 1990–1996, BBC Sport 1995–2001 & 2013–2015, ITV Sport 2001–2010, 2012–2018 & 2020–present, Setanta Sports 2007–2009, ESPN UK 2009–2013, Absolute Radio 2014–2016, BT Sport 2015–2018, ESPN US/ABC 2014–present
- Mark Chapman – BBC Radio 5 Live 2003–present, Channel 5 2007–2009, ESPN UK 2009–2013, BBC Sport 2009–present, Sky Sports 2022–present
- Jack Charlton – ITV Sport 1973–1982, 1992–1996, Channel 5 1999–2001
- Adrian Chiles – BBC Radio 5 Live 2001–2006, BBC Sport 2004–2010, ITV Sport 2010–2014
- Steve Claridge – BBC Radio 5 Live 2000–present, Setanta Sports 2007–2009, BBC Sport 2009–2015
- Gabriel Clarke – ITV Sport 1991–present, Channel 4 2003–2005
- Mark Clemmit – BBC Radio 5 Live 2004–2009, BBC Sport 2009–present, BT Sport 2013–present
- Brian Clough – ITV Sport 1973–1974, 1978–1988
- Joe Cole – ITV Sport, Sky Sports, 2018, BT Sport/ TNT Sport 2019–present
- Chris Coleman – ITV Sport 2010, Sky Sports 2010–2011
- David Coleman – BBC Sport 1958–1982 (stayed with BBC until 2000 but didn't do football)
- Peter Collins – RTÉ Sport 1990–present
- Stan Collymore – BBC Radio 5 Live, 2003–2004, 2007–2008 & 2016, talkSPORT 2008–2016 & 2022–present, Channel 5 2008–2012, British Eurosport 2013, Fox Sports 2014, BT Sport 2014–2015
- Nat Coombs – ESPN UK 2010–2013, Talksport 2013–present
- Aidan Cooney – TV3 Ireland 1998–2004
- Matt Cooper – TV3 Ireland 2008–2011
- Stephen Craigan – ESPN UK 2011–2013, BT Sport 2013–2019, Sky Sports 2011–2013 & 2015–2022, Premier Sports 2022–present, BBC Northern Ireland 2022–present
- Paddy Crerand – ITV Sport 1970, MUTV 2000–present
- Ian Crocker – Sky Sports 1992–2006 & 2009–present, Setanta Sports 2006–2009, ITV Sport 2009–2010
- Garth Crooks – BBC Sport 1982–2022
- Peter Crouch – BT Sport/TNT SPort 2019–present, BBC Sport 2019–present
- Jason Cundy – Talksport 2004–present, Sky Sports 2008–2010
- Kenny Cunningham – RTÉ Sport 2008–present, Sky Sports 2010–present
- Darrell Currie – ESPN UK 2009–2013, BT Sport 2013–present
- Drago Ćosić – HRT 1981–2018
- Ian Darke – BBC Radio 1983–1992, Sky Sports 1992–2010, ESPN/ABC 2010–present, BT Sport 2013–present
- Barry Davies – BBC Radio 1963–1966, ITV Sport 1966–1969, BBC Sport 1969–2004 & 2014, Absolute Radio 2015
- Kevin Davies – BT Sport 2013–present
- Jim Delahunt – Setanta Sports 2006–2009, ESPN UK 2010–2013
- Paul Dempsey – Sky Sports 1989–2006, Setanta Sports 2006–present, BT Sport 2013–present
- Ian Dennis – BBC Radio 5 Live 2002–present, BBC Sport 2013–present
- Marcel Desailly – BBC 2006–2008, Canal+ 2006, ITV Sport 2010–2012
- Lee Dixon – BBC Sport 2004–2012, BBC Radio 5 Live 2004–2012, ITV Sport 2012–present, NBC Sport 2013–present
- Tony Dorigo – ITV Sport 2001–2003, Bravo 2003–2005, Setanta Sports 2006–2007, Channel 5 2007–2008, ESPN UK 2010–2013, Absolute Radio 2010–2016
- Derek Dougan – ITV Sport 1970–1974
- Iain Dowie – BBC Sport 2006–2008, ITV Sport 2008–2009 & 2015–present, Sky Sports 2009–present
- Craig Doyle – ITV Sport 2008–2010
- Peter Drury – BBC Radio 5 Live 1993–1998 & 2013–present, ITV Sport 1998–2013, ESPN UK 2012–2013, BBC Sport 2012–2015, BT Sport 2013–2023, Bein Sport 2015–2023, NBC Sport 2015–present, Sky Sports 2023–present
- Dion Dublin – Sky Sports 2008–2011, BBC Sport 2011–present, BBC Radio 5 Live 2011–present, Channel 4 2022-2024
- Eamonn Dunphy – RTÉ Sport 1978–2018
- Adrian Durham – talkSport 1999–present, Setanta Sports 2007
- Robbie Earle – ITV Sport 2001–2010, NBC 2013–present
- Maurice Edelston – BBC Radio 1957–1976
- Efan Ekoku – ESPN UK 2010, ITV Sport 2013, BBC Sport 2002 & 2013
- Les Ferdinand – Setanta Sports 2007–2009, BBC Sport 2007–2015, ITV Sport 2012–2015
- Alex Ferguson – ITV Sport 1996–1998
- Martin Fisher – BBC Sport 2004–present, Setanta Sports 2006–2009, ITV Sport 2014
- Darren Fletcher – BBC Radio 5 Live 2005–present, BBC Sport 2010–2013, BT Sport 2013–present
- Robbie Fowler – BBC Sport 2012–present, ITV Sport 2014–2018
- Trevor Francis – ITV Sport 1989–1995, Sky Sports 1995–2010, 2013, BT Sport 2015–present
- Kevin Gallacher – Channel 5 2005–2007, Setanta Sports 2006–2009, ITV Sport 2009–2010, ESPN UK 2010–2013, BT Sport 2013–present
- Johnny Giles – RTÉ Sport 1986–2016
- Milena Gimón – DirecTV Sports
- David Ginola – BBC Sport 1998, BT Sport 2013–present, Talksport 2013–present
- Raymond Glendenning – BBC Radio late 1939–1964
- Andy Goldstein – UKTV G2 2006, Talksport 2008–present
- James Alexander Gordon – BBC Radio 1974–2013
- Charlotte Green – BBC Radio 2013–present
- Tim Gudgin – BBC Sport 1995–2011
- Bobby Gould – Talksport 2010–2014, BBC Radio 5 Live 2009–2010, BT Sport 2013
- George Graham – Prem Plus 2001–2007
- Andy Gray – Sky Sports 1990–2011, talkSPORT 2011–present, Al Jazeera/Bein Sports 2012–present, BT Sport 2014
- Michael Gray – BBC Radio 5 Live 2010–2011, Talksport 2011–present, BBC Sport 2012–present, Sky Sports 2013
- Jimmy Greaves – ITV Sport 1981–1995, Setanta Sports 2009
- Alan Green – BBC Radio 1982–2020, BBC Sport 2013–2017
- Perry Groves – BBC Radio 5 Live 2009–2013, Absolute Radio 2010–2016, talksport 2009 & 2013–present
- Tony Gubba – BBC Sport 1972–2012
- Ruud Gullit – BBC Sport 1996 & 2014–present, ITV Sport 1998–2006, Sky Sports 2007–2014, Bein Sport 2014–present
- Nick Halling – Channel 5 2003–2005, ITV Sport 2005–2008, BBC Sport 2009–2011
- Mark Halsey – BT Sport 2013, Al Jazeera/Bein Sports 2014
- Didi Hamann – RTÉ Sport 2010–present, Talksport 2013–present, Sky Sports 2012–2015, BBC Sport 2014–present
- George Hamilton – BBC Sport 1970–1978, RTÉ Sport 1978–present
- Alan Hansen – Sky Sports 1991–1992, BBC Sport 1992–2014
- Owen Hargreaves – BT Sport 2013–present
- Gerry Harrison – ITV Sport (mainly Anglia Television) 1970–1993
- John Hartson – Setanta Sports 2008–2009, ESPN UK 2010–2013, BBC Radio 5 Live 2010–present, BBC Sport 2013–2018, BT Sport 2015–present, Sky Sports 2018–present, ITV Sport 2020–present
- Rob Hawthorne – BBC Radio 5 Live 1990–1995, Sky Sports 1995–present
- Adrian Healey – ESPN/ABC 2003–present, NBC Sports 2008
- John Helm – BBC Radio 1975–1981, ITV Sport 1981–2001, Channel 5 1999–2007, Al Jazeera 2007–present
- Thierry Henry – BBC Sport 2014 & 2016, BBC Radio 5 Live 2016, Sky Sports 2014 & 2015–2018, CBS Sport 2021–present
- Jimmy Hill – ITV Sport 1968–1973, BBC Sport 1973–1998, Sky Sports 1999–2007
- Simon Hill – SBS 2001–2006 Fox Sports 2006–present
- Glenn Hoddle – Sky Sports 2007–2015, ITV Sport 1996, 1998, 2000, 2014–present, BT Sport 2015–present
- Roy Hodgson – BBC Sport 2010 & 2015
- Matt Holland – BBC Radio 5 Live 2006, RTÉ Sport 2010, BBC Sport 2011–2016, Sky Sports 2010–2011, ESPN UK 2010–2011, Talksport 2011–present
- Ray Houghton – talkSport 2001–present, RTÉ Sport 2001–present, Channel 5 2002–2004, Sky Sports 2010–present
- Don Howe – Channel 4 1993–2002
- Richard Hughes – ESPN UK 2012–2013, BT Sport 2013–present
- Jake Humphrey – BBC Sport 2006–2012, BT Sport 2013–2023
- Mike Ingham – BBC Radio 1977–2014
- John Inverdale – BBC Radio 1988–2001, Sky Sports 1990–1991
- David James – BBC Sport 2012, BT Sport 2013–present
- Hugh Johns – ITV Sport 1966–1982
- Roger Johnson – BBC Sport 2004–2010
- Peter Jones – BBC Radio 1966–1990
- Ron Jones – BBC Radio 1983–2004 (latterly also for Today FM in Ireland)
- Chris Kamara – Sky Sports 1996–present
- Roy Keane – Sky Sports 2009 & 2019–present, ITV Sport 2011–present, BBC Sport 2015
- Kevin Keegan – ITV Sport 1991–1998, ESPN UK 2009–2013
- Des Kelly – BT Sport 2013–present
- Brian Kerr – RTÉ Sport 1992–present, TV3 Ireland 2011–present
- Martin Keown – BBC Sport 2005–present, BBC Radio 5 Live 2005–present, TV3 Ireland 2008–2014, ESPN UK 2009–2013, BT Sport 2015–present
- Richard Keys – Sky Sports 1990–2011, talkSPORT 2011–present, Al Jazeera/Bein Sports 2012–present
- Kevin Kilbane – RTÉ Sport 2010, BBC Radio 5 Live 2012–present, BBC Sport 2013–2020, BT Sport 2013–2020, TV3 Ireland 2013–2020
- Denis Law – ITV Sport 1981–1995
- Mark Lawrenson – BBC Radio 5 Live 1995–present, BBC Sport 1997–present, TV3 Ireland 2000–present
- Graeme Le Saux – BBC Sport 2004–2006 & 2017, BBC Radio 5 Live 2004–2006, 2012–present, ITV Sport 2009, NBC Sport 2013–present, Channel 4 2022-2024
- Matt Le Tissier – Sky Sports 2003–2020
- Leonardo – BBC Sport 2006–2010 & 2014, Al Jazeera 2013–present
- Bill Leslie – Channel 5 2002, Sky Sports 2003–present
- Gary Lineker – ITV Sport 1990–1992, BBC Radio 5 Live 1995–1996, BBC Sport 1992–2025, Al Jazeera 2007–2013, NBC Sport 2013–present, BT Sport 2015–2021
- Graham Little – Setanta Sports 2006–2008, Sky Sports 2008–2020, Premier Sports 2020–present
- Gabby Logan – Sky Sports 1996–1998, ITV Sport 1998–2006, BBC Radio 5 Live 2006–2010, BBC Sport 2007–present, Amazon Prime Video 2019–present
- Matthew Lorenzo Sky Sports 1989–1992, ITV Sport 1992–1995
- Rebecca Lowe – BBC Sport 2003–2007, Setanta Sports 2007–2009, ESPN UK 2009–2013, NBC 2013–present
- Des Lynam – BBC Radio 1969–1978, 2004–2005, BBC Sport 1979–1999, ITV Sport 1999–2004, Setanta Sports 2007–2009
- Rob MacLean – Setanta Sports 2004–2009, BBC Scotland 2009–present
- Jimmy Magee – RTÉ Radio 1966–1974, RTÉ Sport 1974–2012, Channel 4 1994
- Darragh Maloney – RTÉ Sport 2002–present
- Alistair Mann – ITV Sport 2001–2006, 2014, Channel 5 2004–2005, BBC Sport 2006–present
- Daniel Mann – Sky Sports 2006–present
- Gabriele Marcotti – talkSport 2001–2007, 2011–present, BBC Radio 5 Live 2007–present, Channel 5 2007–2008, ESPN UK 2010–2013, BT Sport 2013–present
- Rodney Marsh – Sky Sports 1994–2005, talkSport 2005–2006
- Alvin Martin – talkSport 1997–present
- Len Martin – BBC Sport 1958–1995
- Kyle Martino – ESPN UK/ESPN US/ABC 2010, Fox 2011, NBC 2012–2014, NBC 2013–present
- Brian Marwood – Sky Sports 1998–2008
- Sam Matterface – Sky Sports 2007–2010, Talksport 2010–present, ITV Sport 2010–present
- Gary McAllister – Sky Sports 2006–2013, BT Sport 2013–2018
- Mick McCarthy – BBC Sport 2004–2013
- Ally McCoist – BBC Sport 1997–1999, ITV Sport 1999–2007 & 2014–present, Setanta Sports 2006–2007, BT Sport 2015–present, BBC Radio 5 Live 2016–2018, talksport 2018–present, Sky Sports 2020-
- Alan McInally – Sky Sports 1998–present
- Frank McLintock – Sky Sports 1998–2007
- Steve McManaman – Setanta Sports 2007–2009, ESPN UK 2010–2014, BT Sport/TNT Sport 2013–present, ESPN/ABC 2010–present
- Bob McNab – ITV Sport 1970
- Conor McNamara – RTÉ 1997–1998, TV3 1998–2002 & 2017–present, BBC Radio 5 Live 2002–present, BBC Sport 2004–present
- Paul McVeigh – Talksport 2012–2015, Sky Sports 2013–2015
- Paul Merson – Sky Sports 2007–present, Talksport 2010
- Danny Mills – BBC Radio 5 Live 2009–2019, BBC Sport 2013–2019, BT Sport 2015–present, talksport 2019-present
- Scott Minto – Sky Sports 2012–2020, talksport 2021-present
- Jason Mohammad – BBC Sport 2013–present, BBC Radio 5 Live 2016–present
- Brian Moore – BBC Radio 1961–1968, ITV Sport 1968–1998, Talksport 1999–2001
- John Motson – BBC Radio 1968–1971, BBC Sport 1971–2018, BBC Radio 5 Live 2001–2018, talksport 2018–2021
- Guy Mowbray – Eurosport 1997–1999, ITV Sport 1999–2004, BBC Sport 2004–present, BBC Radio 5 Live 2013–present, BT Sport 2015–present
- Danny Murphy – Talksport 2013–present, ITV Sport 2010–2011, BBC Sport 2013–present, BBC Radio 5 Live 2013–present
- Colin Murray – Channel 5 2006–2010 & 2017–2018, BBC Radio 5 Live 2009–2013 & 2016–2023, BBC Sport 2010–2013, talksport 2013–2016, Quest 2018–2021
- John Murray – BBC Radio 5 Live 1997–present, BBC Sport 2000, 2011
- Robbie Mustoe – ESPN UK/ESPN/ABC 2008–2013, NBC 2013–present
- John Murray – BBC Radio 5 Live 1997–present, BBC Sport 2000, 2011
- Gary Neville – ITV Sport 2002, 2008, 2018–present Sky Sports 2011–2015 & 2016–present
- Pat Nevin – BBC Radio 5 Live 1997–present, Channel 5 1999–2012, BBC Scotland 2007–present, BBC Sport 2012–present
- Gary Newbon – ITV Sport 1969–2005, talkSport 1995–2005, Sky Sports 2005–present
- Charlie Nicholas – Sky Sports 2001–2020
- Sally Nugent – BBC Sport 2013–present
- Jacqui Oatley – BBC Radio 5 Live 2005–present, BBC Sport 2007–present, ESPN 2012–2013, ITV Sport 2013–present
- Dan O'Hagan – Eurosport 2003–present, BBC Sport 2004–present, ITV Sport 2013–2014
- Bill O'Herlihy – RTÉ Sport 1972–2014
- David O'Leary – BBC Sport 1994–2002, BT Sport 2014
- Martin O'Neill – RTÉ Sport 1990–1994 BBC Sport 1998–2008, ITV Sport 2011–2014, talksport 2023-present
- Paul Osam – TV3 Ireland 2004–2008
- John O'Shea – Sky Sports 2019-
- Kirsteen O'Sullivan – TV3 Ireland 2010–2012 & 2016, Channel 4 2017
- Jonathan Overend – BBC Radio 5 Live 2013–2020
- Michael Owen – BBC Sport 2013–2014, BT Sport 2013–present, Channel 4 2017
- Alan Pardew – Sky Sports 2017–
- Paul Parker – Setanta Sports 2007–2009
- Ray Parlour – BBC Radio 5 Live 2008–2009, talkSPORT 2009–present
- Alan Parry – BBC Radio 1973–1982, BBC Sport 1981–1985, ITV Sport 1985–1996, Sky Sports 1996–present, talkSport 1998–2002, 2014 & 2016–present
- Ian Payne – BBC Radio 1988–2003, Sky Sports 2003–2010, BBC Radio 5 Live 2010–present, ITV News 2013–present
- Jonathan Pearce – Sky Sports 1992–1994, Capital Radio 1991–2002, Channel 5 1997–2004, BBC Radio 5 Live 2002–2005, 2013–2014, BBC Sport 2004–present, BT Sport 2013–present
- David Pleat – ITV Sport 1981–1984, 1992–1995, 1998–2009, BBC Sport 1995–1998, BBC Radio 5 Live 1991–1995 & 2005–present
- Mark Pougatch – BBC Radio 5 Live 1998–present, BBC Sport 2004–2006, ITV Sport 2015–present
- Gus Poyet – ITV Sport 2013–2014, BBC Sport 2013, Al Jazeera 2013–present
- Jim Proudfoot – Sky Sports 1998–2006, 2013–present, talkSport 1999–2010 & 2014–present, Absolute Radio 2010–2014, Setanta Sports 2006–2009, ESPN 2009–2013, ITV Sport 2011–2013, BBC Sport 2010–2012, Bein Sport 2014–present
- Davie Provan – Sky Sports 2003–present
- Simon Provan - Big East Conference 2024, ESPN+ 2025-present
- David Prutton – Sky Sports 2016–present
- Tony Pulis – BT Sport 2013, BBC Radio 5 Live 2013–present, ITV Sport 2013–present
- Micky Quinn – talkSport 2002–present
- Niall Quinn – Sky Sports 2012–2017, Virgin Media Ireland 2018–present
- Derek Rae – ESPN US 2002–2009, ESPN UK 2009–2013, BT Sport 2013–present
- Harry Redknapp – Setanta 2009–2010, BBC Sport 2010, 2012–2013, Talksport 2010–2012, BT Sport 2015–present, TV3 Ireland 2015–2018
- Jamie Redknapp – BBC Sport 2002–2004, Sky Sports 2004–present
- Damien Richardson – TV3 Ireland 2002–2008, RTÉ Sport 2009–present
- James Richardson – Channel 4 1992–2002, Eurosport 2002–2005, Bravo 2005–2006, Setanta Sports 2007–2009, ESPN UK 2009–2013, BBC Sport 1996, 1998, 2012–2013, BT Sport 2013–present
- Steve Rider – BBC Sport 1994–1996, ITV Sport 2006–2010
- Rachel Riley – Sky Sports 2016–2017
- Bobby Robson – ITV Sport 1998–2004
- Stewart Robson – Channel 5 2007–2009, Talksport 2011–present, ESPN UK 2010–2013, BT Sport 2013–present, Eurosport 2014–present, Bein Sports 2013–present, Fox Sports (2015–2018)
- Leroy Rosenior – BBC Sport 2009–2015
- Jim Rosenthal – BBC Radio 1977–1980, ITV Sport 1980–2012,
- Joe Royle – BBC Sport 2002–2004, ESPN UK 2010–2012
- Max Rushden – Sky Sports 2008–present, Talksport 2008 & 2013–2016, BBC Radio 5 Live 2009–2012
- Richie Sadlier – RTÉ Sport 2010–present
- Mark Saggers – BBC Radio 1989–1992, Sky Sports 1992–2001, BBC Radio 5 Live 2001–2009, talkSport 2009–2021
- Ian St. John – ITV Sport 1978–1998, Setanta Sports 2009
- Robbie Savage – BBC Radio 5 Live 2009–present, BBC Sport 2010–present, ESPN UK 2010–2013, BT Sport 2014–present
- Peter Schmeichel – BBC Sport 2002–2005, 2012–2014, BBC Radio 5 Live 2002–2005
- Alex Scott (footballer, born 1984) – BBC Sport 2019-, ITV Sport 2021, Sky Sports 2017–2021
- Steve Scott – Channel 5 1998–2003
- Alan Shearer – Sky Sports 2005–2006, BBC Sport 2006–present, Al Jazeera/Bein Sports 2010–present
- Ben Shepherd – Sky Sports 2009–2019
- Teddy Sheringham – ITV Sport 2009–2010
- Geoff Shreeves – Sky Sports 1999–present
- Gerald Sinstadt – BBC Radio 1963–1968, ITV Sport 1968–1983, BBC Sport 1983–2011
- Alan Smith – Sky Sports 2002–present
- Matt Smith – BBC Sport 1999–2001, ITV Sport 2001–2015, BT Sport 2015–present, Talksport 2015–present
- Sue Smith – BBC Sport 2007–present, Sky Sports 2019–present
- Graeme Souness – Sky Sports 2005–present, RTÉ Sport 2006–2010, Al Jazeera 2010–2013, TV3 Ireland 2015–present
- Gareth Southgate – ITV Sport 2006–2013, BBC Sport 2009
- Jeff Stelling – BBC Radio 1984–1989, ITV Sport 1989–1991, Channel 4 1991–1992, Sky Sports 1992–2023, talksport 2023–present
- Gary A. Stevens – talkSport 2003–2008
- Trevor Steven – BBC Sport 1998–2002, RTÉ Sport 2006–2014
- Gordon Strachan BBC Sport 2004–2010, ITV Sport 2010–2014, Sky Sports 2016–present
- John Strong – NBC Sports 2013–2014, FOX Sports 2015–present
- Ray Stubbs – BBC Sport 1990–2009, BBC Radio 5 Live 2006–2008, ESPN UK 2009–2013, BT Sport 2013–2016, talksport 2011–2020
- Dean Sturridge – Sky Sports 2003–present
- Gary Taphouse – Sky Sports 2005–present, talksport 2014–present
- Graham Taylor – ITV Sport 1987–1990, 2001–2004, BBC Radio 5 Live 2001–present, Channel 5 2009–2012
- Phil Thompson – Sky Sports 2004–2020
- Steven Thompson – BBC Sport 2020–present
- Simon Thomas – Sky Sports 2010–2019
- Clare Tomlinson – Sky Sports 1998–present
- John Toshack – TV3 Ireland 2001–2004
- Andy Townsend – ITV Sport 2000–2015 & 2016, talkSport 2003–2010 & 2020–present, BT Sport 2015, BBC Radio 5 Live 2015–2020
- Clive Tyldesley – ITV Sport 1987–1992, 1996–present, BBC Sport 1992–1996
- Martin Tyler – ITV Sport 1976–1990, Sky Sports 1990–2023, NBC Sports 2013–present, Fox Sports 2014–2018
- Matthew Upson – ITV Sport 2017, BBC Sport 2016–present
- Terry Venables – BBC Sport 1985–1994, ITV Sport 1994–2006, Setanta Sports 2007–2009
- Barry Venison – Sky Sports 1992–1997, ITV Sport 1997–2004
- Gianluca Vialli – BBC Sport 2012–2023
- Chris Waddle – BBC Sport 1994–1998 & 2014, BBC Radio 5 Live 1998–present, Setanta Sports 2007–2009, ESPN UK 2009–2013
- Andy Walker – Sky Sports 2008–present
- Dan Walker – BBC Sport 2009–2022, BBC Radio 5 Live 2013–2016
- Lucy Ward – BBC Sport 2007–present, ITV Sport 2009, ESPN UK 2011–2013, BT Sport 2013–present, Channel 4 2017
- Neil Warnock – Talksport 2010–2011, 2013–2014, BT Sport 2013–2014
- Elton Welsby – ITV Sport 1983–1994
- Mike West – BBC Sport 2011–present
- Ronnie Whelan – TV3 Ireland 2001–2004, RTÉ Sport 2005–present
- Arlo White – BBC Radio 5 Live 2001–2010, NBC Sport 2012–2022, ITV Sport 2014, BBC Sport 2017–2022
- Faye White – BBC Sport 2012–present
- Ray Wilkins – BBC Sport 1990, ITV Sport 1994, Sky Sports 2011–2013, Talksport 2014–2018, BT Sport 2014–2018
- Russ Williams – ITV Sport 2001–2004, Absolute 2010–2016, talksport 2007–2009
- Bob Wilson – BBC Sport 1974–1994, ITV Sport 1994–2002
- Steve Wilson – BBC Radio 5 Live 1998–2004, 2013–present, BBC Sport 2000–present, Eleven Sports 2018–present
- Kenneth Wolstenholme – BBC Radio 1946–1948, BBC Sport 1948–1971, ITV Sport 1974–1979, Channel 4 1992–1996
- Dave Woods – BBC Radio 5 Live 1997–present, BBC Sport 2004–2005, 2015, Channel 5 2007–2012
- Laura Woods (English presenter) – Sky Sports, ITV Sport 2021–present, talksport 2020-2023
- Ian Wright – ITV Sport 1998–2000 & 2013–present, BBC Sport 2001–2008 & 2015–2023, talkSport 2007–2010, Absolute Radio 2010–2016, BBC Radio 5 Live 2013–2016, BT Sport 2014–2017, Channel 4 2017, Sky Sports 2017
- Dwight Yorke – Sky Sports 2011–present
- Gabo Zelenay– Czechoslovak Radio 1946–1979

== Athletics ==
- Harold Abrahams – BBC Radio 1929–1974
- Rex Alston - BBC Radio 1946-1966
- Steve Backley – BBC Radio 5 Live 2005–present, BBC Sport 2009–2010 & 2014–present
- Sue Barker – BBC Sport 1994–2008
- Roger Black – BBC Sport 1998–2003
- Linford Christie – BBC Sport 1998–2000
- David Coleman – BBC Sport 1958–2000
- Mike Costello – BBC Radio 5 Live 1998–present, BBC Sport 2009–2011 & 2014–present
- Andrew Cotter – BBC Sport 2013–present
- Steve Cram – Eurosport 1995–1999, Channel 4 1997–1999, BBC Sport 1999–present
- Allison Curbishley – BBC Radio 5 Live 2003–present
- Ian Darke – BBC Radio 1985–1990
- Barry Davies - BBC Sport 1973-1981
- Ortis Deley – 3 days for Channel 4 2011 (Sacked after viewer complaints)
- Paul Dickenson – BBC Sport 1987–2014
- Jonathan Edwards – BBC Sport 2003–2016, BBC Radio 5 Live 2013–2016, Channel 4 2012–2016, Eurosport 2017–2021
- Rick Edwards – Channel 4 2011–2013
- Jessica Ennis-Hill - BBC Sport 2018–present
- Brendan Foster – BBC Sport 1983–2017
- Sally Gunnell – Channel 4 1998–1999, BBC Sport 1999–2006
- Tom Hammond – NBC 1992–present
- Peter Hildreth - BBC Radio 1966-1974
- John Inverdale – BBC Sport 2009–2012
- Hazel Irvine – BBC Sport 1999–2010
- Colin Jackson – BBC Sport 2003–present
- Michael Johnson – BBC Sport 2001–2025, Channel 4 2011
- Phil Jones – BBC Sport 2005–present
- Denise Lewis – BBC Sport 2009–present
- Gabby Logan – BBC Sport 2012–present
- Des Lynam - BBC Sport 1983-1998
- Dean Macey – Channel 4 2011–2012, BBC Sport 2010–2013
- Bruce McAvaney – Channel Seven 1980–1983, Channel Ten 1983–1989, Channel Seven 1989–present
- Sonja McLaughlan – BBC Radio 5 Live 1998–present, Channel 4 2012–present
- Norris McWhirter - BBC Sport 1952-1972
- Katharine Merry – BBC Radio 5 Live 2006–2010, Channel 4 2011–present
- Adrian Metcalfe – ITV 1973–1987
- Dave Moorcroft – BBC Sport 1983–1997
- Ian Orr-Ewing - BBC Sport 1948
- Steve Ovett – ITV 1985–1997, Channel 4 1997–1998, BBC Sport 2006
- Alan Parry – BBC Radio 1974–1985, ITV Sport 1985–1997, Sky Sports 2001–2007
- Mary Peters - BBC Radio 1975-1978
- Ron Pickering – BBC Sport 1967–1991
- Paula Radcliffe – BBC Sport 2013–present
- John Rawling – BBC Radio 1990–2005, Channel 4 2011–present, BBC Sport 2019–present
- Max Robertson - BBC Sport 1955-1964
- Helen Rollason - BBC Sport 1989-1997
- Jim Rosenthal – ITV Sport 1983–1997
- Jeff Stelling - BBC Radio 1985-1988
- Stuart Storey – BBC Sport 1973–2008, 2010–2017, Setanta Sports 2006–2009 (With BBC for Diamond League World Feed)
- Iwan Thomas – Channel 4 2011–present
- Rob Walker - BBC Sport 2015–present

== Australian rules football ==
- Malcolm Blight – Network Ten 1995–1997, Seven Network 1997–1998, 2000 Network Ten 2002–2005
- James Brayshaw – Seven Network 1997–2001 and 2018–present, Nine Network 2002–2006
- Dermott Brereton – Seven Network unknown–2001, Nine Network 2002–2011, Foxtel 2012–present
- Wayne Carey – Foxtel 2006–present
- Dennis Cometti – Seven Network 1986–2001, 2007–2016, Nine Network 2002–2006
- Chris Dittmar – Seven Network 1995–present
- Tim Gossage – Network Ten 2002–2011
- Tom Harley – Seven Network 2012–2014
- Anthony Hudson – Channel Seven 1999–2001, Network Ten 2002–2011, Fox Footy 2012–present
- Craig Hutchison – Channel Seven 1999–2006, Nine Network 2006–present
- Brett Kirk – Channel Seven 2012
- Peter Landy
- Tim Lane – ABC (Aus) 1979–present, Network Ten 2003–2011, Seven Network 2018–present
- Dan Lonergan – ABC (Aus) 1997–present
- Mick Malthouse – Channel 7 2012, 3AW 2012
- Bruce McAvaney – Channel Seven 1980–1983, Channel Ten 1983–1989, Channel Seven 1989–present
- Eddie McGuire – Nine Network 1994–2006, Fox Footy 2012–2022
- Hamish McLachlan – Channel Seven 2012–present
- Glenn Mitchell – ABC (Aus) 1990–present
- Stephen Quartermain – Network Ten 2002–2011
- Michael Roberts – Nine Network 1989–present
- Sandy Roberts – Channel Seven 1980s–2001, Fox Footy 2014–present
- Brian Taylor – Nine Network 2002–06, Fox Footy 2007–11, Channel Seven 2012–present
- Robert Walls – Seven Network 1998–2001, Network Ten 2002–2011, 1116 SEN 2012–present
- Peter Walsh – ABC (Aus) 1978–present
- Gerard Whateley – ABC (Aus) Radio 2002–2017, 1116 SEN 2018–present
- Basil Zempilas – Channel Seven 2012–2021

== Badminton ==
- Anthony Clark – Sky Sports 2013–present
- Gillian Clark – BBC Sport 1993–present
- Barry Davies – BBC Sport 1977–1995
- Gail Emms – BBC 2009–present
- David Mercer – BBC Sport 1993–2016
- Peter West – BBC Sport 1970–1983

== Baseball ==
- Marv Albert – NBC 1979–1989
- Mel Allen – NBC 1951–1953, 1955–1958, 1960–1963
- Red Barber – CBS 1939–1966
- Bonnie Bernstein – ESPN 2006–present
- Tommy Boyd – Channel 5 1997
- Marty Brennaman – 700 WLW 1974–present
- Thom Brennaman – Fox 1996–2020
- Jack Brickhouse – WGN-TV 1948–1981
- Simon Brotherton – BBC Radio 2004–present
- Lorn Brown
- Jack Buck – CBS 1983–1991, KMOX 1954–2001
- Joe Buck – Fox 1996–2021
- Chip Caray – Fox 1996–2000, WGN 1998–2004, TBS 2005–2009
- Harry Caray – WGN 1982–1997
- Skip Caray – TBS 1976–2007, NBC 2000
- Tom Cheek – Toronto Blue Jays, 1977–2004
- Josh Chetwynd – Five 2001–2003, 2006–2008, BBC Radio 2004–2006, 2011–present
- Nat Coombs – BBC Radio 2011–present
- Bob Costas – NBC 1984–2000, MLB Network 2009–present
- Dizzy Dean – ABC 1953–1954, CBS 1955–1965
- Peter Gammons – ESPN 1990–2009, MLB Network 2010–present
- Joe Garagiola – NBC 1961–1964, 1975–1988
- Jonny Gould – Five 1997–2008, BBC Radio 2011–present
- Curt Gowdy – NBC 1966–1975
- Milo Hamilton – Chicago Cubs 1980–84, Houston Astros 1987–2012
- Ernie Harwell – Detroit Tigers 1960–1991, 1993–2002
- Russ Hodges – New York/San Francisco Giants 1949–1970
- Harry Kalas – WPHL 1971–82,1993–98 WTXF 1983–92 CSN 1976–2009
- Michael Kay – YES Network 2002–present
- Ralph Kiner – WWOR–TV 1962–1998 WPIX 1999–2013
- Tony Kubek – NBC 1965–1989
- Steve Lyons – Fox 1996–2006
- Denny Matthews – Fox Sports K.C. 2007–present
- Tim McCarver – ABC 1984–1990, 1994–1996 CBS 1990–1994, Fox 1996–2013
- Sean McDonough – CBS 1990–1999, ESPN 2000–present
- Al Michaels – ABC (US) 1976–1989, 1994–1995
- Jon Miller – NBC 1986–1989, ESPN 1990–2010
- Joe Morgan – ABC (US) 1986–1987, NBC 1994–2000, ESPN 2000–2010
- Bob Murphy – WOR-TV 1962–2003
- Brent Musburger – CBS 1984, ABC 1994–1995
- Lindsey Nelson – NBC 1957–1961, WOR-TV, 1962–1979
- Pee Wee Reese – CBS 1960–1965, NBC 1966–1968
- Harold Reynolds – ESPN 1996–2006, MLB Network 2009–present
- Phil Rizzuto
- Art Rust Jr. – WABC 1980s
- Sam Ryan – ESPN 2004–2006 MLB Network 2011
- Vin Scully – NBC 1955–1956, 1962–1963, 1965–1966, 1983–1989
- Jim Simpson – NBC 1966–1977
- John Smoltz – TBS 2007–2008 & 2010–2013, Fox 2014–present
- John Sterling – WABC 1989–2002, WCBS 2003–present
- Dick Stockton – CBS 1990–1992, Fox 1996–present, TBS 2007–present
- Bob Uecker – Milwaukee Brewers, 1971–present
- Matt Vasgersian – MLB Network, 2009–present

== Basketball ==
- Marv Albert – NBC 1990–1997, 1999–2002 TNT 2002–2021
- John Amaechi – BBC 2008–present
- Charles Barkley – TNT 2000–present
- Bob Blackburn – KOMO 1967–1978, KIRO 1978–1987, KJR 1987–1992
- Mike Breen – NBC (Olympics) 1996, 2000, 2004, 2008, NBC 1997–2002, MSG 1992–present, ESPN/ABC 2003–present
- Hubie Brown – CBS 1987–1990, Turner Sports 1990s–2002, ESPN/ABC 2006–present
- Doris Burke – ESPN/ABC 1991–present
- Kevin Calabro – Seattle SuperSonics 1987–2008, Turner Sports
- Steve Carfino – Network Ten 1992–1995, 2010–2014, Fox Sports 1996–2010
- John Casey – Fox Sports 1995–2010, ABC (Australia) 2010–2015
- Doug Collins – Turner Sports 1989–1995, NBC 1998–2001, TNT 2003–2010
- Bob Costas – KMOX 1974–1976, NBC 1997–2000
- Eddie Doucette
- Jim Durham – ESPN Radio 1996–present
- Ian Eagle – CBS 1998–present, Fox Sports Net New York/YES Network 1995–present
- Mike Fratello – NBC 1990–1993, TNT 1999–2004, 2007–present
- Walt Frazier – MSG Network 1989–present
- Andrew Gaze – Melbourne United 2010–present
- Mike Gorman – Boston Celtics 1981–present
- Tim Gossage – Network Ten 1992–1997, 2014
- Kevin Harlan – Turner Sports 1996–present
- Chuck Harmon – WWSEN 2006–present
- Shane Heal – Sydney Kings 2010–2014
- Chick Hearn – Los Angeles Lakers 1961–2002
- Tom Heinsohn – CBS 1983–1990, Boston Celtics 1981–2020
- Hot Rod Hundley – CBS 1975–1980, New Orleans/Utah Jazz 1974–2009
- Mark Jackson – ESPN/ABC 2005–2011
- Gus Johnson – CBS 1996–2011, Big Ten Network, 2008–present, Fox 2013–present
- Steve "Snapper" Jones – NBC 1990–2002
- Clark Kellogg – CBS 1993–present
- Steve Kerr – TNT 2003–2007, TNT 2010–2014
- Namugenyi Kiwanuka
- Ralph Lawler – Los Angeles Clippers 1978–present
- Rebecca Lobo – ESPN 2004–present
- Verne Lundquist – CBS 1984–1995, 1998–2016
- Brett Maher – Adelaide 36ers 2010–present
- Al McCoy – Phoenix Suns 1972–present
- Sean McDonough – CBS 1990–2000, ESPN 2000–present
- Al Michaels – ABC (US) 2003–2006
- Reggie Miller – TNT 2005–present
- Johnny Most – Boston Celtics 1953–1990
- Brent Musburger – CBS 1975–1989, ESPN/ABC 1990–2017
- Jim Nantz – CBS 1985–present
- Bob Neal
- Brad Nessler – ESPN 1992–2015, ABC (US) 1997–2015, CBS 2016–present
- Shaquille O'Neal - TNT 2011–present
- Billy Packer – NBC 1974–1981, CBS 1981–2008
- Stephen Quartermain – Network Ten 1992–1997
- Bill Raftery – CBS 1986–present
- Ahmad Rashad – NBC 1990–2002
- Tony Ronaldson – Perth Wildcats 2010–2015
- Ryan Ruocco – ESPN 2013–present
- Bill Russell – ABC 1971–1973, CBS 1979–1983
- Bill Schonely – Portland Trail Blazers 1970–1998
- Kenny Smith – TNT 1998–present
- Dick Stockton – CBS 1981–1990, TNT 1995–present
- Chuck Swirsky
- Joe Tait – Cleveland Cavaliers 1970–1980, 1982–2011
- Mike Tirico – ABC (US) 2002–2016
- Jeff Van Gundy – TNT 2002–2003, ESPN/ABC 2007–present
- Dick Vitale – ESPN 1979–present
- Bill Walton – NBC 1990–2002, ESPN/ABC 2002–2009
- Bill Woods – Network Ten 1992–1997, 2014–2015

== Bowls ==
- John Bell – BBC Sport 1987–2001
- Nick Brett – BBC Sport 2021
- David Bryant – BBC Sport 1982–1987
- David Corkill – BBC Sport 2000–present
- Dougie Donnelly – BBC Sport 1981–2002
- Janice Gower – YouTube
- Greg Harlow – BBC Sport 2005–present
- Sian Honnor – BBC Sport
- Mal Hughes – BBC Sport 1983–2001
- David McGill -BBC Sport 1984–1997
- John Price – BBC Sport 2002–present
- Andy Thomson – BBC Sport 2005–present
- David Vine – BBC Sport 1972–1989

== Boxing ==
- Teddy Atlas – ESPN2
- Manish Bhasin – BBC Sport 2012–2014
- Michael Buffer
- Steve Bunce – BBC Radio 5 Live 2003–present, BBC Sport 2003–present, Setanta Sports 2006–2009, Boxnation 2011–2022, BT Sport 2013–present
- Harry Carpenter – BBC Sport 1949–1994 & 2001
- Fran Charles – HBO 2000–present
- Dave Clark – Sky Sports 2006–present
- Howard Cosell – (1918–1995, covered boxing, later denounced the sport; lead announcer on Monday Night Football for most of its existence): ABC (US) 1953–1985
- Mike Costello – BBC Radio 5 Live 2005–2021, DAZN 2021-2025
- Ian Darke – BBC Radio 1981–1992, Sky Sports 1992–2010, 2013, talksport 2014
- Paul Dempsey – Sky Sports 1990–2006, Setanta Sports 2006–2009, Boxnation 2011–present
- Don Dunphy
- George Foreman – HBO 1991–2004
- Randy Gordon – ESPN 1980–1982, USA Network, 1983–1988, MSG Network, 1986–1988
- Reg Gutteridge – ITV Sport 1962–1999, Sky Sports 1996–1999
- John Inverdale – BBC Sport 2001–2008
- Roy Jones Jr. – HBO 2004–2006
- Max Kellerman – ESPN 1998–2004, Fox Sports 2004–2005, HBO 2005–2018
- Richard Keys – Boxnation 2011–2013
- Jim Lampley – HBO 1987–present
- Harold Lederman – HBO 1986–present
- Howard Leigh
- Jimmy Lennon Jr.
- Lennox Lewis – HBO 2007–present, BBC Sport 2012
- Jimmy Magee – RTÉ Radio 1 1962–2017, RTÉ Sport 1970s–2017
- Barry McGuigan – ITV Sport 1993–1995, 2005–2010, Sky Sports 1995–2005, 2010–2013, Boxnation 2013–2022
- Larry Merchant – HBO 1978–2012
- Jim Neilly – BBC Radio 1982–1994, BBC Sport 1992–2020
- Bob Papa
- Mark Pougatch − Channel 5 2011–2015, ITV 2015–2020
- John Rawling – BBC Radio 1987–2005, ITV Sport 2005–2010, Setanta Sports 2007–2009, Sky Sports 2010–2013, Boxnation 2011–2022, talksport 2022-present
- Jim Rosenthal – ITV Sport 1982–1996, 2005–2010, Boxnation 2012–2022
- Bob Sheridan – ESPN2, 2003–2005 Don King Productions
- Barry Tompkins
- Jim Watt – ITV Sport 1984–1999, Sky Sports 1996–2016
- Richie Woodhall – BBC Sport 2002–present, BBC Radio 5 Live 2002–present, Setanta Sports 2007–2009, Sky Sports 2010–present, talksport 2011, 2014, ITV Sport 2015–present
- Anna Woolhouse – Sky Sports 2016–present

== Cricket ==
- David Acfield - BBC Sport 1986-1990
- Jonathan Agnew – BBC Radio 1991–present, BBC Sport 1999, 2007-2009
- Paul Allott – BBC Sport 1994–1995, Sky Sports 1993–present
- Rex Alston – BBC Radio 1945–1964
- James Anderson - BBC Radio 2017–present, BBC Sport 2021–present, Sky Sports 2024 (for the hundred only)
- John Arlott – BBC Radio 1946–1980, BBC Sport 1965–1980
- Asif Iqbal - BBC Sport 1992, 1996
- Michael Atherton – Channel 4 2002–2005, talkSport 2002–2005 & 2022–present, Sky Sports 2005–present
- Trevor Bailey – BBC Radio 1967–1999
- Jack Bannister – BBC Sport 1984–1999, talkSport 1999–2015
- Peter Baxter – BBC Radio 1973–2007
- Richie Benaud – BBC Sport 1960–1999, Nine Network 1977–2014, Channel 4 1999–2005, Channel 5 2009
- Harsha Bhogle – ESPN Star sports 1995–present, BBC Radio 1996-2008
- Ian Bishop - Channel Four 2000-2004, Sky Sports 2005–present
- Henry Blofeld – BBC Radio 1972–1991, 1994–2017, Sky Sports 1991–1994
- Ian Botham – Sky Sports 1995–2019
- Geoffrey Boycott – Sky Sports 1990–1998, BBC Sport 1990–1998, 2006–2007, talkSport 1998–2003, ESPN Star Sports 2001–2006, Channel 4 2003–2005, BBC Radio 2005–2019, Channel 5 2006–2019, Ten Sports 2006–2011
- Carlos Brathwaite - BBC Sport 2020–present, BBC Radio 2021–present
- Freddie Brown – BBC Radio 1957–1969
- James Brayshaw – Nine Network 2009–present
- Stuart Broad - Sky Sports 2018–present
- Mark Butcher – Sky Sports 2009–present, ITV Sport 2011–2014, talksport 2021–present
- Michael Carey - BBC Radio 1982-1985
- Greg Chappell – Nine Network 1989–1994
- Ian Chappell – BBC Sport 1977, 1993, 1997-1999, Nine Network 1980-2022, ITV Sport 2011, Channel 5 2009, BBC Radio 2011
- Michael Clarke - Nine Network 2014-2018
- Brian Close - BBC Sport 1978-1982
- Charles Colville – Sky Sports 1990–present
- Dennis Cometti – ABC (Aus) 1973–1986
- Denis Compton – BBC Sport 1958–1975
- Jeremy Coney – Sky Sport, New Zealand 1990s–2004, Sky Sports 2007–present
- Alastair Cook – BBC Radio 2019–present, BBC Sport 2020–present, TNT Sports 2023–present
- Dominic Cork - BBC Radio 2007-2010
- Chris Cowdrey – talkSport 1999–2008
- Tony Cozier – BBC Radio 1966–2015, Channel Nine 1979–1989, Sky Sports 1990–2009
- Peter Cranmer - BBC Radio 1958-1974
- Aidan Crawley - BBC Sport 1939-1947
- Colin Croft - BBC Radio 1994-2009 (not all years), BBC Sport 1995, 1999
- Charles Dagnall - BBC Radio 2012-2021, Sky Sports 2021–present
- Gerald de Kock – SABC, Supersport, BBC Radio 1994-1999, 2009
- Ted Dexter - BBC Sport 1968-1988
- Simon Doull - Sky Sports
- Neil Durden-Smith - BBC Radio 1964-1975, BBC Sport 1967-1970
- Farokh Engineer - BBC Radio 1986, 1990
- Percy Fender - BBC Radio 1936-1946, BBC Sport 1947
- Graeme Fowler – BBC Radio 1989–2005
- Angus Fraser – BBC Radio 2000–2010, ITV Sport 2011
- Bill Frindall – BBC Radio 1966–2009
- Mike Gatting – BBC Radio 2002–2007
- Sunil Gavaskar - Various
- Alan Gibson – BBC Radio 1962–1975
- Adam Gilchrist – Nine Network 2008-2011, Network Ten 2013–present
- Graham Gooch – BBC Radio 2002–2009
- David Gower – BBC Sport 1994–1999, Sky Sports 1999–2019
- Tom Graveney - BBC Sport 1980-1991
- Tony Greig – BBC Sport 1975-1976, 1983, Nine Network 1981–2012, Channel 4 2005
- Isa Guha - ITV Sport 2011-2014, BBC Radio 2014–present, Sky Sports 2017-2019, BBC Sport 2020–present
- Ian Healy – Nine Network 1999–2019, Channel 5 2015
- Mike Hendrick - BBC Radio 1990-1994
- Michael Holding – Sky Sports 1990–2021
- Mark Howard – Network Ten 2013–present
- Robert Hudson – BBC Sport 1949–1950, BBC Radio 1958–1968
- Simon Hughes – Channel 4 1999–2005, Channel 5 2006–2017, BBC Radio 2007–present, ITV 2010–2014
- Nasser Hussain – Sky Sports 2004–present
- Mike Hussey – Nine Network 2013–2016
- Ray Illingworth – BBC Sport 1984–1993
- Robin Jackman - BBC Sport 1987-1988, 1994
- Brian Johnston – BBC Sport 1946–1969, BBC Radio 1965–1993 (on Test matches; he had earlier commentated for BBC Radio on county matches)
- Nick Knight – Sky Sports 2005–present
- Jim Laker – BBC Sport 1969–1985
- Tim Lane – ABC (Aus) 1988–present
- Bill Lawry – Nine Network 1977–2018
- Brett Lee – Nine Network 2011–2016
- Tony Lewis – BBC Radio 1977–1985, BBC Sport 1984–1998
- David Lloyd – Sky Sports 1990–1992 & 1999–2021, BBC Radio 1991–1995
- Andrew Maher – Network Ten 2013–present
- Simon Mann – BBC Radio 1996–present, BBC Television 2020–present
- Neil Manthorp - BBC Radio 2007, 2012, 2016
- Vic Marks – BBC Radio 1992–present
- Rod Marsh - Nine Network 1985-1990, 1996-1998
- Howard Marshall – BBC Radio 1927–1945
- Christopher Martin-Jenkins – BBC Radio 1973–2012, BBC Sport 1981–1989
- Jim Maxwell – ABC (Aus) 1973–present
- Alan McGilvray – ABC (Aus) 1938–1985 (and also sometimes for× BBC Radio when Australia toured England)
- Colin Milburn - BBC Sport 1969, BBC Radio 1980, 1985-1988
- Keith Miller - BBC Sport 1977-1979
- Alison Mitchell – BBC Radio 2007–present, Channel 5 2018–2019, BBC Sport 2020–present
- Glenn Mitchell – ABC (Aus) 1990–present
- Tom Moody - Nine Network 2002-2018
- Don Mosey – BBC Radio 1974–1991
- Johnnie Moyes – ABC (Aus) 1950–1963
- Pat Murphy – BBC Radio 1983–present
- Mark Nicholas – Sky Sports 1995–1999, Channel 4 1999–2005, talksport 2002–2003, Nine Network 2003–2018, Channel 5 2006–2019, ITV Sport 2010–2011
- Daniel Norcross - BBC Radio 2015–present
- Simon O'Donnell – Nine Network 1988–2011
- Kerry O'Keeffe – ABC (Aus) 2001–present
- Shaun Pollock - Sky Sports
- Mark Pougatch – BBC Radio 2006–2009, ITV Sport 2010–2012
- Ramiz Raja - BBC Radio 2007-2012, 2019
- Ebony Rainford-Brent - BBC Radio 2015–present, BBC Sport 2021–present, BBC Sport 2020–present, Sky Sports 2020-present
- Dermot Reeve - BBC Sport 1997-1999, Channel Four 1999-2005
- Barry Richards - BBC Sport 1998-1999, Channel Four 2000-2002
- Viv Richards - BBC Radio 1999-2014 (not all years), BBC Sport 1999
- Greg Ritchie - Nine Network 1992-1997
- R. C. Robertson-Glasgow - BBC Sport 1947-1948
- Peter Roebuck – ABC (Aus) 2001–2011
- Mike Selvey – BBC Radio 1988–2008
- Ravi Shastri – ESPN Star Sports 1994–present, BBC Sport 1996, 1999
- Navjot Singh Sidhu – ESPN Star Sports 1999–2003, Ten Sports 2003–present
- Michael Slater – Channel 4 2001–2005, ABC (Aus) 2005–present, Nine Network 2005–2018, Channel 5 2015
- Ed Smith – BBC Radio 2012–present, ITV Sport 2016
- Ian Smith – Sky Sport, New Zealand 1990s–, Channel 4 1999–2003
- Matt Smith – ITV Sport 2010–2014, BT Sport 2017–present
- Keith Stackpole - Nine Network 1977-1986
- Andrew Strauss - Sky Sports 2013–present
- Graeme Swann - BBC Radio 2014-2019
- E.W. Swanton – BBC Radio 1938–1975, BBC Sport 1948–1967
- Donna Symmonds - BBC Radio 1998-2000
- Mark Taylor – Nine Network 1999–present
- Fred Trueman – BBC Radio 1974–1999, BBC Sport 1976–1982
- Phil Tufnell – BBC Radio 2003–present, BBC Sport 2020–present
- Frank Tyson - BBC Sport 1977-1983
- Michael Vaughan – BBC Radio 2009–present, Channel 5 2010–2019, BT Sport 2016–2018, BBC Sport 2020–present
- Max Walker - Nine Network 1986-1991
- Ian Ward – Sky Sports 2003–present
- Shane Warne – Channel Nine 2008–2022, Sky Sports 2009–2022
- Everton Weekes - BBC Sport 1976, 1979
- Peter West – BBC Radio 1948–1959, BBC Sport 1952–1986
- Arlo White – BBC Radio 2005–2008
- Alan Wilkins – ESPN Star Sports 1997–present
- Bob Willis – BBC Sport 1985–1987, Sky Sports 1990–2019
- Thomas Woodrooffe - BBC Sport 1939
- Arthur Wrigley – BBC Radio 1934–1965
- Bruce Yardley - Nine Network 1989-199?
- Norman Yardley – BBC Radio 1956–1969

== Cycling ==
- Clare Balding – BBC Sport 2016
- Matt Barbet – Channel 4 2014–2015
- Chris Boardman – ITV Sport 2005–2025, BBC Sport 2000–present
- OJ Borg – Channel 4 2015
- Kait Borsay – Channel 4 2014 – present
- Ned Boulting – ITV Sport 2001–2025, Channel 4 2015
- Jason Bradbury – ITV Sport 2016
- Simon Brotherton – BBC Radio 5 Live 1994–present, BBC Sport 2013–present, Channel 4 2016
- Mark Cavendish – BBC Sport 2012, Channel 4 2015
- Nicole Cooke – Channel 4 2014
- Orla Chennaoui – Eurosport 2019-
- Dean Downing – Channel 4 2016
- Jill Douglas – BBC Sport 2000–present
- Rochelle Gilmore – BBC Sport ?–present
- Roger Hammond – ITV Sport 2013
- Rob Hayles – BBC Sport ?–present, Radio 5 Live ?–present, ITV Sport ?, Channel 4 2015
- Jake Humphrey – BBC Sport 2011–2012
- Gary Imlach – Channel 4 1994–2001, ITV Sport 2001–present
- Sean Kelly – Eurosport
- Richard Keys – Channel 4 1985–1989
- Phil Liggett – Channel 4 1985–2001, ITV Sport 2001–2015, Versus, 2004–present
- Graham Little – ITV Sport ?-2015, Channel 4 ?-2013
- Dan Lloyd – Eurosport
- Craig MacLean – BBC Sport 2013
- Lucy Martin – ITV Sport 2016
- James McCallum – Channel 4 2015
- Anthony McCrossan – ITV Sport ?
- David Millar – ITV Sport 2014–2025
- Hugh Porter BBC Sport 1983–2012, ITV Sport 2007–2025, Channel 4 2014 – present
- Shanaze Reade – BBC Sport(BMX) 2016
- James Richardson Eurosport 2006–present
- Jo Rowsell – Channel 4 2012–
- Paul Sherwen – Channel 4 1989–2001, ITV Sport 2001–2015, Versus 2004–present, SBS (Australia) Tour of France current
- Brian Smith – ITV Sport ?-2015
- Jamie Staff – BBC Sport 2014–present
- Matt Stephens – ITV Sport −2013, Channel 4 2016, Eurosport ?
- Rob Walker – Channel 4 2016
- Charlie Webster – ITV Sport 2016
- Sian Welby – ITV Sport ?, Channel 4 2014–2015
- Sidney White – official Rio 2016 cycling announcer
- Wong Kam-po – Hong Kong Cable Television 2020 (Olympics only)

== Darts ==
- Martin Adams – BBC Sport 2004–2011, Eurosport/Quest 2019-2023
- Vassos Alexander – BBC Radio 5 Live 2006–2010, BBC Sport 2011–2018, ESPN 2012–2013, BT Sport 2015–2018, Channel 4 2017–2018
- Caroline Barker – BBC Sport 2016–2019
- Steve Beaton – ITV Sport 2007–2008, Nuts TV 2008, Eurosport 2010–2016
- Georgie Bingham – Eurosport/Quest 2019
- David Bobin – Sky Sports 1994, 2002–2003
- O.J. Borg – ITV Sport 2011, Nuts TV 2008
- Ned Boulting – ITV Sport 2007–2025
- Eric Bristow – ITV Sport 1999, Sky Sports 1993–2016
- Sarah Cawood – Challenge TV 2007
- Helen Chamberlain – BT/TNT Sport 2022–2025, BBC Sport 2022-2025, Sky Sports 2003–2009, Sky Box Office 2004
- Dave Clark – Sky Sports 2000–2020, Sky Box Office 2004
- David Coleman – BBC Sport 1979
- Nat Coombs – Eurosport/Quest 2019
- David Croft – BBC Radio 5 Live 2003–2006, BBC Sport 2005–2012, Setanta Sports 2008, ESPN UK 2011–2012, Sky Sports 2013–2021
- Dickie Davies – ITV Sport 1974–1988
- Dan Dawson – ITV Sport 2014–present, talksport 2009–present, BBC Sport 2016–2019, Sky Sports 2021-present
- Dougie Donnelly – BBC Sport 1993–1998
- Peter Drury – ITV Sport 2008–2011
- Mark Dudbridge – Sky Sports 2016
- Glen Durrant – ITV Sport 2026–present, Sky Sports
- Bobby George – BBC Sport 1998–2016 & 2022-2025, Eurosport 2014–2015, Channel 4 2017–2018
- Andy Goldstein – Sky Sports 2020
- Tony Green – BBC Sport 1979–2016, Challenge TV 2007, Setanta Sports 2008, ESPN UK 2011–2013, BT Sport 2015–2016
- Tony Gubba – BBC Sport 1983–1991
- John Gwynne – ITV Sport 1999 & 2010, Sky Box Office 2004, Challenge TV 2007, Sky Sports 1993–2013, Sky Sports 2015–2022 (part-time), Eurosport 2014–2015, 2020, Dave 2016, Quest 2019-2022, BBC Sport 2022
- Ted Hankey – BBC Sport 2009–2012, BT Sport 2015, Eurosport 2015
- Rod Harrington – Sky Sports 2005–present, Challenge TV 2007, Nuts TV 2008, ITV Sport 2015
- Trevor Harris – Eurosport 2013–present
- Deta Hedman – Channel 4 2017–2018
- Eamonn Holmes – BBC Sport 1991–1992, ITV Sport 1999
- David Icke – BBC Sport 1988–1990
- John Inverdale – BBC Sport 1999–2000
- Charlotte Jackson – Setanta Sports 2008
- Peter Jones – ITV Sport 1972–1974
- Dave Lanning – ITV Sport 1972–1988, 1993–1996, talkSport 1999, Sky Box Office 2004, Sky Sports 1993–2010, Sky Sports 2013 (one-off return appearance)
- Wayne Mardle – Sky Sports 2010–present, ITV Sport 2026–present
- Chris Mason – ITV Sport 2008–present, Dave 2016, BT Sport 2017–present, Channel 4 2017–2018, talksport 2017–present, Eurosport/Quest 2019-2021
- Scott Mitchell – ESPN 2013, BBC Sport 2014, Eurosport 2014–2015, Dave 2016
- Jason Mohammad – BBC Sport 2016–2017
- Chris Murphy – BBC Sport 2022–present
- Colin Murray – BBC Sport 2010–2016
- Gary Newbon – Sky Sports 2005
- Paul Nicholson – BBC Radio 5 Live 2014, ITV Sport 2015, BBC Sport 2016–present, Channel 4 2017–2018, Eurosport/Quest 2019–present
- Jacqui Oatley – ITV Sport 2015–present
- Janie Omorogbe – ITV Sport 2007–2010
- Tony O'Shea – BBC Sport 2009–2014 & 2022-2025, Eurosport 2014–2015, Dave 2016. Eurosport/Quest 2019
- John Part – BBC Sport 1995–2007, Sky Box Office 2004, ESPN UK 2012–2013, Sky Sports 2013–present
- Nigel Pearson – Sky Sports 1996–2022
- Devon Petersen – Sky Sports 2019-2022
- Jim Proudfoot – BBC Sport 2013–2015, ESPN UK 2012–2013, ITV Sport 2014, BT Sport 2015 & 2017–2018, Channel 4 2017–2018, talksport 2017–present
- Peter Purves – BBC Sport 1979–1983
- Stuart Pyke – Sky Sports 2003–present, Sky Box Office 2004, Challenge TV 2007, ITV Sport 2007–2025, Nuts TV 2008, Bravo 2010, talksport 2017–present
- John Rawling – ITV Sport 2007–2025, ESPN UK 2012, BBC Radio 5 Live 2014, BBC Sport 2014–2016, BT Sport 2015–2018, Dave 2016, Channel 4 2017–2018, talksport 2017–present, Eurosport/Quest 2019–present
- George Riley – BBC Sport 2015–2019, BT Sport 2015–2016
- Adam Smith – Sky Sports 2020
- Matt Smith – ITV Sport 2007–2015, BT Sport 2017–present
- Jeff Stelling – Sky Sports 1993–2002, 2005
- Ray Stubbs – BBC Sport 1999, 2001–2009, 2022-2025, ESPN UK 2011–2013, BT Sport 2015–2016, talksport 2017–2022
- Phil Taylor – Sky Sports 2018, BBC Sport 2024–present
- Laura Turner (darts player) Eurosport 2019, Sky Sports 2019–present
- David Vine – BBC Sport 1975–1978
- Sid Waddell – BBC Sport 1978–1994, talkSport 1999–2000, Sky Box Office 2004, Sky Sports 1994–2012
- Rob Walker – BBC Sport 2009–2016, Channel 4 2017–2018
- Alan Warriner-Little – ITV Sport 2007–2025, Nuts TV 2008, BBC Sport 2016–2019
- Mark Webster – BBC Sport 2016–2019, Sky Sports 2018–present, ITV Sport 2020–present
- Anna Woolhouse – Sky Sports 2022-
- Tony Wrighton – ITV Sport 2011

== Figure Skating ==
- Ted Barton
- Robin Cousins – BBC
- Lina Fedorova – Telesport
- Tara Lipinski – NBC
- Evgenia Medvedeva – Channel One
- Anna Pogorilaya – Eurosport Russia
- Irina Slutskaya – Channel One
- Tatiana Tarasova
- Maxim Trankov – Channel One
- Johnny Weir – NBC
- Katarina Witt – ARD
- Alexei Yagudin – Channel One
- Alina Zagitova – Channel One

== Golf ==
- Paul Affleck – BBC Radio 2003–2005
- Vassos Alexander - BBC Radio 2009-2014
- Peter Alliss – BBC Sport 1961–2020, ABC (US) 1975–2016
- Brian Anderson – TNT 2019
- Paul Azinger – ABC (US) 2006–2016, BBC Sport 2014–present, FOX 2016–2019, NBC 2019–present
- Ian Baker-Finch – ABC (US) 1998–2006, CBS 2006–present
- Seve Ballesteros – BBC Sport 2003–2004
- Eilidh Barbour – BBC Sport 2017–present
- Rich Beem – Sky Sports 2015–present
- Gary Bender – TBS 1992
- Chris Berman – ESPN 1986–2014
- Richard Boxall – BBC Sport 1999, Sky Sports
- Billy Ray Brown – ABC (US) 1999–2016
- Ken Brown – Sky Sports 1992–2000, BBC Sport 2000–present, Setanta Sports 2007–2009
- Joe Buck – Fox 2015–2019
- Donna Caponi – TBS 1991
- Bob Carpenter USA 1988–1989
- Harry Carpenter – BBC Sport 1965–1994
- Andrew Castle – Sky Sports 1992–2000
- Bobby Clampett – CBS / TBS / TNT 1991–2007
- Clive Clark – BBC Sport 1977–1995
- Howard Clark – BBC Sport 1993, 1999, Sky Sports 1999–present
- Darren Clarke – Sky Sports 2014–present
- David Coleman – BBC Sport 1967–1981
- Bob Costas – NBC 2003–2013
- Andrew Cotter – BBC Sport 2004–present, BBC Radio 2000–2004, 2012–present
- Henry Cotton – BBC Sport 1978–1982
- Bill Cox – BBC Sport 1959–1968
- Bruce Critchley – BBC Sport 1980–1993, Sky Sports 1994–2017
- Bernard Darwin – BBC Radio 1930–1947
- Laura Davies – BBC Sport 2001–2005
- Bruce Devlin – ESPN 1986
- Dougie Donnelly – BBC Sport 1990–2008
- Kitrina Douglas – BBC Radio 1995–2004
- David Duval – ESPN 2020–present
- Paul Eales – BBC Radio 1997–2005
- Dick Enberg – NBC 1995–2000, CBS 2000–2010
- Nick Faldo – ABC (US) 2004–2007, CBS 2007–present, BBC Sport 2012–2014, Sky Sports 2016
- David Feherty – CBS 1997–2016, NBC 2016–present
- Bill Flemming – ABC 1966
- Russell Fuller – BBC Radio 2001–2010
- Bernard Gallacher – BBC Radio 2006–present
- Terry Gannon – ABC (US) 1991–2016, NBC 2016–present
- Frank Gifford – CBS 1969–1971, ABC 1971–1973
- Frank Glieber – CBS 1968–1985
- Wayne Grady – BBC Sport 2000–2013
- Alan Green – BBC Radio 1988–2003
- Butch Harmon – Sky Sports 1996–present
- Alex Hay – BBC Sport 1978–2004
- Chick Hearn – NBC 1959–1965
- Dan Hicks – NBC 1992–present
- Tommy Horton – BBC Radio 1988–1997
- Bernard Hunt – BBC Sport 1978
- Denis Hutchinson – BBC Sport 1999–2000
- Andre Iguodala – TBS 2018
- Trevor Immelman – TNT 2017–present
- John Inverdale – BBC Radio 1988–present
- Hazel Irvine – BBC Sport 1994–2017
- Tony Jacklin – ABC 1974, BBC Sport 1980–1989, 2012
- Keith Jackson – ABC 1967
- John Jacobs – BBC Sport 1967
- Peter Jacobsen – ABC 1993–1994
- Mark James – BBC Sport 2001–present
- Ernie Johnson Jr. – TBS / TNT 1995–2018
- David Jones – BBC Radio 1996–1997
- Gary Koch – NBC 1996–present
- Peter Kostis – CBS 1992–present
- Renton Laidlaw – BBC Radio 1974–1992
- David Leadbetter – TBS 1991–1994
- Robert Lee – Sky Sports 2000–present
- Justin Leonard – NBC 2017–2018
- Gary Lineker – BBC Sport 2001–2009
- David Livingstone – Sky Sports 1994–2018
- Henry Longhurst – BBC Radio 1937–1957, BBC Sport 1949–1977, CBS 1965–1975, ABC 1967
- Verne Lundquist – CBS 1983–1995, 1998– TNT 1995–1998, 2006, 2011
- Bill Macatee – CBS 1990–present
- Maureen Madill – BBC Radio 1997–2006, BBC Sport 2000–present
- Andrew Maher – Network Ten 2009–2011
- Roger Maltbie – NBC 1995–present
- Dave Marr – ABC 1970–1991, BBC Sport 1992–1997
- Stephen McAllister – BBC Sport 1999
- Gary McCord – CBS 1986–present
- Mark McCormack – BBC Sport 1967–1995
- Sean McDonough – CBS 1996–1999, ESPN 2010–present
- Ross McFarlane – Sky Sports 2001–present
- Eddie McGuire – Nine Network 2009–2011
- Jim McKay – CBS 1957–1961, ABC 1962–1993, 1996–2001
- Conor McNamara – BBC Radio 2006–present
- Steve Melnyk – CBS 1991, ABC 1992–1997
- Cliff Michelmore – BBC Sport 1964
- Cary Middlecoff – ESPN 1982
- Johnny Miller – NBC 1990–2019
- Colin Montgomerie – Sky Sports
- Don Mosey – BBC Radio 1977–1984
- Andrew Murray – BBC Radio 1992–2007
- Ewen Murray – Sky Sports 1991–present
- Brent Musburger – CBS 1983–1989, ABC 1992–1994, ABC 1992–1996, ESPN 2008–2016
- Jim Nantz – CBS 1985–present, BBC Sport 2010–2012
- Bob Neal – TBS 1991–1994
- Byron Nelson – ABC 1965–1974
- Lindsey Nelson – NBC 1954–1965
- Jack Newton – BBC Sport 1984
- Alison Nicholas – BBC Radio 2005–2006
- Jack Nicklaus – ABC 1986–1994
- Frank Nobilo – BBC Sport 2013–2015
- Greg Norman – Fox 2015
- Brett Ogle – Foxtel 1997–present
- Peter Oosterhuis – Sky Sports 1994–present, BBC Sport 1994–1995, The Golf Channel 1995–1997, CBS 1997–present
- Bud Palmer – CBS 1956, NBC 1959–1965
- Lou Palmer – ESPN 1982–1985
- Philip Parkin – Golf Channel 2000–present, BBC Sport 2009–present
- Jerry Pate – BBC Sport 1999–2000
- Dottie Pepper – NBC 2005–2013, 2015–present
- Dan Pohl – NBC 1995
- Mark Pougatch – BBC Radio 5 Live 1999–present, BBC Sport 2011
- Ronan Rafferty – Sky Sports 1997–2007, Setanta Sports 2007–2009
- Chris Rea – BBC Radio 1975–1996
- Dai Rees – BBC Sport 1965–1967
- Steve Rider – ITV Sport 1981–1985, Channel 4 1983–1985, BBC Sport 1985–2005
- Sandy Roberts – Seven Network 1980–2008, 2012–2013
- Mark Roe – BBC Radio 2007–2012, Sky Sports c.2013–present
- Gene Sarazen – NBC 1955
- Chris Schenkel – CBS 1956–1964, ABC 1965–1975
- John Schroeder – NBC 1995
- Ray Scott – NBC 1959–1965, CBS 1969–1974
- Vin Scully – CBS 1975–1982
- Jim Simpson – NBC 1964–1965, ESPN 1982–1986
- Marilynn Smith – ABC 1973
- Curtis Strange – ABC (US) 1995–2004, ESPN 2008–present, BBC 2013, FOX 2016–present
- Ed Sullivan – NBC 1959
- Pat Summerall – CBS 1968–1994
- Dave Thomas – BBC Sport 1975–1977
- Peter Thomson – BBC Sport 1962–1997
- Mike Tirico – ABC (US) 1996–2016, NBC 2016–present
- Sam Torrance – BBC Sport 2002–2011, Sky Sports 2014–present
- Jay Townsend – BBC Radio 2000–present
- Lee Trevino – NBC 1983–1989
- Roger Twibell – ABC 1987–1991
- Jean van de Velde – BBC Sport 2004, 2010
- Scott Van Pelt – NBC 2017–present, ESPN 2020–present
- Ken Venturi – CBS 1967–2002
- Lanny Wadkins – CBS 2000–2006, GOLF Channel 2014–present
- Mickey Walker – BBC Sport 1993–2001
- Tom Watson – ABC 2008
- Jack Whitaker – CBS 1965–1966, ABC 1982–1989
- Gary Wolstenholme – BBC Sport 1997–2007, Sky Sports 2013

== Horse racing ==
- Chic Anderson – CBS 1970–1979
- Clare Balding – BBC Radio 5 Live 1994–2012, BBC Sport 1996–2012, Channel 4 2013–2016
- Peter Bromley – BBC Sport 1958–c. 1970, BBC Radio 1959–2001
- Charlsie Cantey – CBS 1977–1986, ESPN 1985–2002, ABC 1986–2001, NBC 2000–2005
- Willie Carson – BBC Sport 1997–2012
- Ed Chamberlin – ITV Sport 2017–present
- Larry Collmus – NBC 2011–present
- Trevor Denman – ESPN 2006–present
- Tom Durkin – NBC 1984–2010
- Mick Fitzgerald – BBC Sport 2009–2012, Channel 4 2013–2016, ITV Sport 2017–present
- John Francome – Channel 4 1987–2012, BBC Radio 5 Live 2016
- Raleigh Gilbert – BBC Sport/BBC Radio 1970–1972, ITV Sport 1972–1985, Channel 4 1984–1996
- Raymond Glendenning – BBC Radio at least 1938–1960
- Tom Hammond – NBC 1984–present
- Simon Holt – Channel 4 1994–2016
- Dave Johnson – ABC 1978–2000 ESPN 1985–2002
- Chris Lincoln – ESPN 1985–2007
- Nick Luck – Channel 4 2013–2016
- Cornelius Lysaght – BBC Radio 1992–present
- John McCririck – ITV Sport 1981–1984, Channel 4 1984–2012
- Jim McGrath (Australian, known as "J.A. McGrath" when he writes for The Daily Telegraph to avoid confusion): BBC Sport 1992–2012
- Jim McGrath (British) – ITV Sport 1981–1984, Channel 4 1984–2016
- John Oaksey – ITV Sport 1969–1985, Channel 4 1984–2002
- Bob Neumeier – NBC
- Michael O'Hehir – RTÉ Radio 1 1951–1985 (he sometimes also worked for the BBC, for example commentating on the Grand National)
- Peter O'Sullevan – BBC Radio 1947–1962, BBC Sport 1947–1997
- Richard Pitman – BBC Sport 1975–2012
- Walter Swinburn – Channel 4 2000–2004
- Bill Tung – Rediffusion Television/ATV Home 1967–1997, 2003–2005

== Ice hockey ==
- Bruce Affleck – St. Louis Blues 1987–2000 (KPLR, Prime Sports Midwest)
- John Ahlers – Anaheim Ducks 2003–present (Bally Sports West, Bally Sports SoCal, Victory+),
- Kenny Albert – Washington Capitals 1992-1994 (Home Team Sports, New York Rangers 1995–present (WFAN, WEPN, MSG Network), Fox 1995–1999, NBC (2012–2021), TBS/TNT (2021–present)
- Marv Albert – NBC 1990–1994
- Steve Armitage – CBC 1977–present
- Jamie Baker – San Jose Sharks 2014–present (NBC Sports California)
- Scotty Bowman – CBC 1987–1990
- Rick Bowness – CBC 1993–1996, TBS/TNT (2025)
- Herb Brooks – SportsChannel America 1988–1991
- Dean Brown – CBC 2000–2014, Ottawa Senators 1997–present (Sportsnet Ontario, CFGO)
- John Buccigross – ESPN 1998–2004, 2021–present, ABC 2021–present
- Brendan Burke – New York Islanders 2015–present (MSG Sportsnet), NBC (2017–2021) TNT/TBS 2021–present
- Cassie Campbell-Pacall – CBC 2006–2023, Calgary Flames 2014–2023(Sportsnet Pacific/SN Flames), ESPN 2021–present
- Don Cherry – CBC 1981–2019
- Bill Clement – ESPN/ABC 1986–1988, 1992–2004, ESPN/ABC 1999–2004, Philadelphia Flyers 1989–1992, 2007–2020 (SportsChannel Philadelphia, NBC Sports Philadelphia)
- Bob Cole – CBC 1969–2019
- Ward Cornell – CBC 1958–1971
- Marc Crawford – CBC 1998–1999
- Fred Cusick – Boston Bruins on WSBK-38 1971–1997, NESN 1983–1995
- Chris Cuthbert – CBC/CBC 1984–2005, 2020–2026 TSN Hockey 2005–2020, NBC 2005–2020, Sportsnet 2020–present
- Keith Dancy – CBC 1952–1966
- Ken Daniels – CBC 1992–1997, Detroit Red Wings regional broadcasts 1997–present (channel 50, Bally Sports Detroit)
- Ted Darling – CBC 1955–1970
- John Davidson – CBC 1983–1986, 1995–2006, Fox 1995–1999, ESPN 1993–94, ABC 2000–2002 (as studio analyst), 1993–94, 2003–04 (as color commentator) NBC 2006, New York Rangers 1986–2006 (MSG Network)
- Jack Dennett – CBC
- Gary Dornhoefer – CBC 1978–1986, Philadelphia Flyers 1992–2006 (SportsChannel Philadelphia, Comcast SportsNet Philadelphia)
- Bruce Dowbiggin – CBC 1984–present
- Mike Emrick – ESPN 1986–1988, ABC 1993–1994, 2000–2004, New Jersey Devils 1983–86, 1993–2011 (SportsChannel New York, MSG Network, MSG Plus), Philadelphia Flyers 1989–1993 (SportsChannel Philadelphia) Fox 1995–1999, NBC 2005–2020
- Brian Engblom – ESPN 1992–2004, ABC 2000–2004, Versus 2005–2011 (as studio analyst), NBC 2011–2015, Tampa Bay Lightning 2015–present (Bally Sports Sun)
- Alex Faust – Los Angeles Kings 2017–2023 (Bally Sports West), NBC 2017-2021, TNT/TBS 2022-present, Boston Bruins 2023-2024 (NESN), New York Rangers 2023–present
- Bernie Federko – St. Louis Blues 2000–present (KPLR, Bally Sports Midwest)
- Ray Ferraro – ESPN/ABC 2002–2004 (as studio analyst), 2021–present (as lead color commentator) Edmonton Oilers 2003–2008 (Rogers Sportsnet), NBC 2006–07, 2015–2021 TSN 2008–2022 (Toronto Maple Leafs and Ottawa Senators 2014–2022), CBC 2023–2026, Vancouver Canucks 2023–present (Sportsnet Pacific)
- Elmer Ferguson – CBC
- John Ferguson – CBC 1973–1975
- Patrick Flatley – CBC 1998–1999
- Pat Foley – Chicago Blackhawks 1980–2006, 2008–2022 (SportsChannel Chicago, Hawkvision, NBC Sports Chicago, WGN-TV)
- John Forslund – Hartford Whalers 1995-1997 (SportsChannel New England), Carolina Hurricanes 1997-2020 (Fox Sports Carolinas), NBC 2011-2021, Seattle Kraken 2021-present (Root Sports Northwest, Kraken Hockey Network), TNT/TBS 2022–present, Prime Video 2024-present
- Jim Fox – Los Angeles Kings 1990–present
- Elliotte Friedman – CBC 2003–2026, Sportsnet 2014-present
- Martine Gaillard – CBC 1998–2004
- Garry Galley – CBC 2007–2026, Ottawa Senators 2007–2010 (Sportsnet Ontario), Sportsnet 2014–present
- Danny Gallivan – CBC 1950–1984
- John Garrett – CBC 1986–1998, 2006–2008, 2014–2026, Sportsnet 1998–2002, 2014–2026 Vancouver Canucks 2002–2023 (Sportsnet Pacific/SN Canucks), Calgary Flames 1998–2008 (RSN Pacific)
- Bob Goldham – CBC 1960–1964, 1969–1978
- Bill Good Jr. – CBC 1970–1977
- Randy Hahn – San Jose Sharks 1991–present (SportsChannel Pacific, Fox Sports Bay Area, Fox Sports Net Bay Area, FSN Bay Area, NBC Sports California)
- Brian Hayward – Anaheim Ducks 1993–present (Bally Sports West, Bally Sports SoCal), CBC 1995–2004, ESPN/ABC, ESPN/ABC 2000, NBC 2006–07, 2012–14
- Bret Hedican – San Jose Sharks 2011–2024 (NBC Sports California)
- Bill Hewitt – CBC 1958–1982
- Foster Hewitt – CBC Radio 1931–1963, CBC 1952–1960
- Dave Hodge – CBC 1971–1987
- Kelly Hrudey – CBC 1998–2026, Sportsnet 2014–present
- Jim Hughson – CBC 1985–1986, 2006–2021, TSN 1987–1994, Sportsnet 1998–2002, 2014–2021 Vancouver Canucks 1998–2008 (RSN Pacific)
- Bobby Hull – CBC 1980–1983
- Dick Irvin Jr. – CBC 1966–1999
- Brenda Irving – CBC 2001–2006
- Rick Jeanneret – Buffalo Sabres 1971–2022 (WUTV, WIVB-TV, Empire Sports Network, MSG Network/MSG Western New York)
- Dan Kelly – St. Louis Blues 1969–1988 (KPLR, KDNL-TV) CBS 1969–1972, 1980, NHL Network 1975 1975–1980, Hughes 1979–80, CBC 1977–1980, USA Network 1979–85, ESPN 1985–86, CTV 1984–86, Canwest/Global 1987–88
- John Kelly – St. Louis Blues 1989–1992, 2006–2025 (KPLR, Bally Sports Midwest), Tampa Bay Lightning 1993–1995 (Bally Sports Sun), Fox 1997–98, Colorado Avalanche 1995–2004 (Altitude), Los Angeles Kings 2025–present (Angels Broadcast Television), ESPN 2025–present
- Mark Lee – CBC/CBC 1997–2014
- Steve Levy – ESPN 1993–2004, 2021–present, ABC 1999–2004, 2021–present
- Doug MacLean – CBC/Sportsnet
- Ron MacLean – CBC/Sportsnet 1986–present, CBC/Sportsnet 2014–present
- Jeff Marek – CBC 2007–present, CBC 2009–2011
- Jiggs McDonald – Los Angeles Kings 1967–1972 (KTLA), Atlanta Flames 1996–1980 (WTCG 17), New York Islanders 1980–1995, 2016–2017 (WOR-TV, SportsChannel New York, MSG Network/MSG+), SportsChannel America 1988–1992, Toronto Maple Leafs 1995–1998, Florida Panthers 2003–04, 2006–07 (Fox Sports Florida)
- Brian McFarlane – CBC 1964–1989, NBC 1972–1975
- Pierre McGuire – TSN 2002–2011, NBC 2006–2021
- Wes McKnight – CBC 1952–1958
- Peter McNab – SportsChannel America 1988–1992, New Jersey Devils 1989–1995 (SportsChannel New York), Fox 1996–1999, Colorado Avalanche 1995–2023 (Altitude), NBC 2006–07
- Howie Meeker – Vancouver Canucks 1975–1980 (BCTV), CBC 1968–1987, TSN 1987–1998
- Tom Mees – ESPN 1985–88, 1992–93 (as studio host), 1992–96 (as play-by-play announcer) ABC 1993–1994)
- Barry Melrose – ESPN 1996–2004, 2021–2023, ABC 1999–2004, 2021–2023
- Mark Messier – ESPN/ABC 2021–present
- Joe Micheletti – St. Louis Blues 1985–1988, 1992–1998 (KPLR, Bally Sports Midwest) Fox 1995–1999, New York Islanders 1998–2006 (Fox Sports Net New York), MSG Network 2006–2025 (New York Rangers)
- Greg Millen – CBC 1995–1998, 1999–2025, Sportsnet 2014–present, Ottawa Senators 2006–present (Sportsnet Ontario), Toronto Maple Leafs 2006–2020 (Sportsnet Ontario)
- Bob Miller – Los Angeles Kings 1973–2017
- Gord Miller – TSN 2002–present (Toronto Maple Leafs and Ottawa Senators 2014–present)
- A. J. Mleczko – NBC 2018–2021, New York Islanders 2018–present (MSG Network/MSG Plus), ESPN 2021–present
- Chris Moore – New Jersey Devils 1988–1993 (WABC-AM), Florida Panthers 1993-1999 (WQAM)
- Scott Morrison – CBC
- Lou Nanne – CBC 1979, CBS 1980, Minnesota Wild 2019–present (Bally Sports North)
- Harry Neale – CBC 1985–present, Toronto Maple Leafs 1986–2007, Buffalo Sabres 2007–2012 (MSG Network)
- Bob Neumeier – WBZ 1996–1999
- Scott Oake – CBC/CBC 1988–2026, Sportsnet 2014–present
- Eddie Olczyk – Pittsburgh Penguins 2000–2003 (Fox Sports Pittsburgh), NBC 2006–2021, Chicago Blackhawks 2006–2022 (NBC Sports Chicago, WGN-TV), Seattle Kraken 2022–present (Root Sports Northwest, Kraken Hockey Network), TBS/TNT 2021–present
- Darren Pang – ESPN 1992–2004, ABC 1993–1994, 2000–2004, NBC 2007–2021, TBS/TNT 2021–present, Chicago Blackhawks 1990–1995, 2024–present (SportsChannel Chicago, Hawkvision), St. Louis Blues 2009–present (Bally Sports Midwest), Arizona Coyotes 2005–2009 (Bally Sports Arizona), St. Louis Blues 2009–2024(Bally Sports Midwest)
- Jim Peplinski – CBC 1990–1995, 1997, Calgary Flames 1990–1995, 1997 (CICT-DT)
- Lloyd Pettit – WGN-TV, Chicago Blackhawks 1956–76
- Gerry Pinder – CBC 1979–1981
- Walter Pratt – CBC 1970–1978
- Bruce Rainnie – CBC 2003–present, CBC 2003–2014
- Mickey Redmond – CBC 1980–1987, CBC 1980–1987, Detroit Red Wings 1985–present (channel 50, Bally Sports Detroit)
- Drew Remenda – San Jose Sharks 2006–2007, 2007–2014 (Fox Sports Net Bay Area, NBC Sports California) CBC 2006–2007
- Chico Resch – CBC 1978, 1988, Minnesota North Stars 1987–89 (KMSP-TV, KMSP-TV, Midwest Sports Channel) New Jersey Devils 1996–2014 (SportsChannel New York, Fox Sports Net New York, MSG Network/MSG Plus)
- Jim Robson – CBC 1970–1985, BCTV, CHEK 1970–present (BCTV, CHEK, Canucks TV)
- Howie Rose – New York Islanders 1995–2016 (SportsChannel New York, Fox Sports Net New York, FSN New York, MSG Network/MSG Plus)
- Sam Rosen – MSG Network 1984–2024, Fox 1995–1999
- Scott Russell – CBC/CBC 1989–2003, 2005–present
- Derek Sanderson – Boston Bruins on WSBK-38 1984–1997, NESN 1984–1995
- John Saunders – ESPN/ABC 1992–2004, ESPN/ABC 1992–2004, 2000–2004
- Dave Shea – NESN 1984–2004
- John Shorthouse – CKNW 1999-2008, Sportsnet Pacific/SN Canucks 2008-present, CBC 2014–2026
- Steve Shutt – CBC 1990–1994
- Craig Simpson – Sportsnet 1998–2002, 2014–present, CBC 2007–2026
- Doug Smith – CBC
- P.J. Stock – CBC 2007–present
- Red Storey – CBC
- Gary Thorne – New Jersey Devils 1987–93 SportsChannel New York, ESPN 1992–2004, ABC 1999–2004
- Ron Tugnutt – CBC 2005–2007
- John Wells – CBC/CBC 1979–1984
- Ed Westfall – New York Islanders 1979–1995 (WOR-TV, SportsChannel New York), SportsChannel America 1979–1992
- Ken Wilson – ESPN 1985–86, St. Louis Blues 1985–2004 (KPLR, Fox Sports Midwest)
- Don Wittman – CBC/CBC 1979–2008

== Kickboxing ==
- Michael Schiavello – HDNet
- Will Vanders – Eurosport 2002–present

== Electronic Sports ==
- Sam "Kobe" Hartman-Kenzler – Riot Games 2012–present
- Christopher "MonteCristo" Mykles – OnGameNet 2012–2017, Blizzard Entertainment 2017–2019
- Erik "DoA" Lonnquist – OnGameNet 2012–2017, Blizzard Entertainment 2017–2019, 2021

== Motorsport ==
- James Allen – ESPN 1992–1997, ITV Sport 1997–2008, talksport 2009–2011, BBC Radio 5 Live 2012–2015, BBC Sport 2013–2015, Ten Sport 2010–present
- Jack Arute – ABC (US) 1984–2009, Versus 2009–2011
- Mark Beretta – Seven Network 2007–2014
- Dick Berggren – CBS 1994–2000, 2014–present, Fox 2001–2012
- Allen Bestwick NBC/TNT Sports 1999–2007, ESPN/ABC 2007–present
- Mark Blundell – ITV Sport 1997–2008, Sky Sports 2012–present
- Martin Brundle – BBC Sport 1989, 1995, 2009–2011, ITV Sport 1997–2008, Sky Sports 2012–present
- Steve Byrnes – Fox 2001–2015
- David Coulthard – BBC Sport 2009–2015, Channel 4 2016–present
- Charlie Cox – BBC Sport 1996–2013
- David Croft – BBC Radio 5 Live 2006–2011, ITV Sport 2007–2008, BBC Sport 2009–2011, Sky Sports 2012–present
- Neil Crompton – ABC (Aus) 1980–1984, Seven Network 1985–1995, 2007–2014, Network Ten 1996–2006, Fox Sports and Ten sports 2015–present
- Anthony Davidson – BBC Radio 5 Live 2008–2011, BBC Sport 2009–2011, Sky Sports 2012–present
- Leigh Diffey – BBC 1999–2001, SPEED 2001–2004, 2007– Network Ten 2004–2007, SPEED 2007–2012, NBC Sports 2013–present
- Chris Economaki – ABC (US) 1961–1984, CBS 1984–1990, ESPN 1987–1989
- Ben Edwards – Eurosport 1993–2002, ITV 2002–2011, Sky Sports 2002–2011, BBC Sport 2012–2015, Channel 4 2016–2021
- Calvin Fish – Motor Trend TV, GT World
- Louise Goodman – ITV Sport 1997–present
- Scott Goodyear – ABC (US) 2001–present
- Jeff Gordon – Fox 2016–present
- Jennie Gow – BBC Sport 2010, 2012–2015 & 2018–present, BBC Radio 5 Live 2011 & 2012–present, ITV Sport 2014–2016
- Maurice Hamilton – BBC Radio 5 Live 1992–2011, BBC Sport 2009–2011, talksport 2012–present
- Jeff Hammond – Fox 2001–present
- Martin Haven – Eurosport
- Johnny Herbert – Sky Sports 2012–present
- Damon Hill – Sky Sports 2012–present
- John Hindhaugh – Eurosport, Radio Le Mans 1989–
- Jake Humphrey – BBC Sport 2009–2012
- James Hunt – BBC Sport 1980–1993
- Tony Jardine – BBC Sport 1992–1996, ITV 1997–2005, Sky Sports 2005–present
- Bob Jenkins – ESPN, ABC (US) 1979–2003, Speed Channel 2003–2006, Versus 2010–2013
- Eddie Jordan – BBC Sport 2009–2015, Channel 4 2016–2023
- Mike Joy – CBS 1984–2000, Premiere 1996–2001, Fox 2001–present
- Ted Kravitz – ITV Sport 2002–2008, BBC Sport 2009–2011, Sky Sports 2012–present
- Simon Lazenby – Sky Sports 2012–present
- Jonathan Legard – BBC Radio 1997–2004, 2012, BBC Sport 2009–2010
- Lee McKenzie – Worked for ITV and Sky previously, BBC Sport 2009–2015, Channel 4 2016–present
- Larry McReynolds – Fox 2001–present
- Paul Page – Voice of Indianapolis 500 Mile Race 1977–1987, NBC Sports 1978–1987, ABC Sports 1987–2017, ESPN 1979–2017
- Jonathan Palmer – BBC Sport 1993–1996
- Jolyon Palmer – BBC Sport 2018–present
- Suzi Perry – Sky Sports 1997–2000, BBC Sport 2000–2009 & 2013–2015, BT Sport 2016–present
- Natalie Pinkham – BBC Sport 2011, BBC Radio 5 Live 2011, Sky Sports 2012–present
- Marty Reid – ABC/ESPN 2001–2013
- Steve Rider – BBC Sport 1985–1996, ITV Sport 2006–present, Sky Sports 2012–present
- Matt Roberts – BBC Sport 2005–2013, Eurosport 2014–present
- Greg Rust – Network Ten 1997–present, Fox Sports 2015–present
- Holly Samos – BBC Radio 5 Live 2007–2011, Channel 4 2016
- Steve Scott – Channel 5 2000–2002
- Barry Sheene – Network Ten 1997–2002
- Mark Skaife – Seven Network 2009–2014, Fox Sports 2015–present
- Ken Squier – CBS Sports/Turner Sports/TNN Motorsports/MRN Motor Racing Network/World Sports Enterprises/Motor Week Illustrated 1971–present
- Jackie Stewart – ABC (US) 1971–1984
- Simon Taylor – BBC Radio 1976–1997, ITV Sport 1997
- Georgie Thompson – Sky Sports 2012
- Wendy Venturini – Speed 2006–2013
- Krista Voda – Speed (2001–2013), Fox (2007–2014), NBC (2015–present)
- Murray Walker – BBC Sport 1949–1996, ITV Sport 1997–2001, Network Ten 2006–2007, BBC Radio 2007, BBC Sport Website 2009–2015, Channel 4 2016–2018
- Darrell Waltrip – Fox 2001–present
- John Watson – Eurosport 1990–1997, ESPN 1997–1998, BBC Sport 1998–2001, Sky Sports 2002–present, GT World 2016–present
- Matthew White – Network Ten 2015–present, Seven Network 2007–2014
- Bill Woods – Network Ten 1997–2006

== Pool ==
- Karl Boyes – Sky Sports 2021-
- Allison Fisher – Sky Sports 2020-
- Ted Lerner – Sky Sports 2013
- Andy McDonald – Sky Sports
- Michael McMullan – Sky Sports 2020
- Nick Schulman – Sky Sports 2021
- Sid Waddell – Sky Sports 1995–2005
- Jim Wych – Sky Sports 1990–present

== Rugby league ==
- Greg Alexander – Fox Sports 2001–present
- Braith Anasta – Fox Sports 2015–present
- Danny Buderus – Fox Sports 2016–present
- Gary Belcher – Fox Sports 2005–2017, Seven Network – 2017
- Laurie Daley – Fox Sports 1999–2007, 2009–present, Nine Network 2008
- Jonathan Davies – BBC Sport 1997–present
- Darrell Eastlake – Nine Network 1982–2005
- Michael Ennis – Fox Sports 2017–present
- Ray French – BBC Sport 1979–2013
- Mark Gasnier – Fox Sports 2012–present
- Ray Hadley – Nine Network 2012–present
- Eddie Hemmings – BBC Radio 1983–1990, Sky Sports 1990–2019
- Andrew Johns – Nine Network 2007–present
- Matthew Johns – Nine Network 2003–2009, Fox Sports 2010–present
- Brett Kimmorley – Fox Sports 2010–present, Seven Network 2017–present
- Wally Lewis – Nine Network 2006–present
- Erin Molan – Nine Network 2012–present, sideline commentator
- Rex Mossop – Seven Network 1970–1986, Network Ten 1986–1990
- Stuart Pyke – BBC Radio 5 Live 2002–present
- Steve Roach – Nine Network 1990–1992, – Fox Sports 2016–present
- Warren Smith – Fox Sports 1995–present
- Mike Stephenson – Sky Sports 1990–2021
- Peter Sterling – Nine Network 1992–present
- Paul Vautin – Nine Network 1994–present
- Andrew Voss – Nine Network 1994–present, Premier Sports 2013, BBC Sport 2013 & 2021
- Eddie Waring – BBC Sport 1951–1981
- Ray Warren – Network Ten 1976–1986, Nine Network 1990–present
- Dave Woods – BBC Radio 5 Live 1994–2009 & 2024–present, BBC Sport 2000–2023, Premier Sports 2012–2014, Sky Sports 2024–present

== Rugby union ==
- Rob Andrew – BBC Radio 5 Live 1999–2005
- Stuart Barnes – BBC Sport/BBC Radio 5 Live 1995–1996, Sky Sports 1996–present, ITV Sport 2007, Sky NZ 2011, TV3 Ireland 2015
- Martin Bayfield – BBC Radio 5 Live 2001–2007, ITV Sport 2007–2013 & 2015–present, BT Sport 2013–present
- Gordon Bray – ABC (Aus) 1971–1988, Network Ten 1988–1991, 2013–present, Seven Network 1991–2006, Fox Sports 2007–2012
- Matt Burke – Network Ten 2013–present
- Eddie Butler – BBC Sport 1991–2022, Channel 4 2018–2019, Premier Sports 2018–2022
- Jon Champion – ITV Sport 2007, 2015
- Andrew Cotter – BBC Radio 5 Live 2000–2004 & 2015–present, BBC Sport 2004–present, ESPN UK 2011–2013, BT Sport 2014–present
- Lawrence Dallaglio – BBC Sport 2009–2013, ITV Sport 2011 & 2015–present, BT Sport 2013–present
- Jonathan Davies – BBC Sport 1997–present
- Matt Dawson – BBC Radio 5 Live 2007–present, BBC Sport 2012, BT Sport 2013–2016
- Jill Douglas – BBC Sport 1997–1999 & 2003–2015, Sky Sports 1999–2003, Setanta Sports 2007–2009, ITV Sport 2011 & 2013–present
- Craig Doyle – BBC Sport 2004–2008, ITV Sport 2008–2013, 2015 & 2019, BT Sport 2013–present
- Mark Durden-Smith – Sky Sports 1997–2002, ITV Sport 2007 & 2013–2017, ESPN UK 2010–2013, Channel 5 2017 – present
- Martin Gillingham – ITV Sport 2009–present, Sky Sports 2009–present, BT Sport 2013–2014
- Will Greenwood – Sky Sports 2006–2021 & 2025, ITV Sport 2007
- George Gregan – ITV Sport 2015
- Jeremy Guscott – BBC Sport 1996–2021, ITV Sport 1999, OSN 2015
- Miles Harrison – BBC Radio 1991–1994, Sky Sports 1994–present, ITV Sport 2007 & 2015–present, SKY NZ 2011
- Austin Healey – ITV Sport 2003, BBC Radio 5 Live 2006–2010, BBC Sport 2006–2010, ESPN UK 2010–2013, BT Sport 2013–present
- Alastair Hignell – BBC Radio 1986–1989, ITV Sport 1991–1996, BBC Radio 5 Live 1996–2008
- John Inverdale – Sky Sports 1990, BBC Sport 1994–2021, ITV Sport 2015
- Andy Irvine – BBC Radio 5 Live 1992–2004
- Ben Kay – ESPN UK 2010–2013, RTÉ Sport 2011–2015, BT Sport 2013–present, ITV Sport 2015–present, talksport 2025
- Thierry Lacroix – France 2 2000–2006, TF1 2007–present, Eurosport 2007–present
- Michael Lynagh – Sky Sports 1998–present, ITV Sport 1999–present, talksport 2013
- Justin Marshall – BBC Sport 2009–2012, Sky Sports NZ 2013–present
- Sir Ian McGeechan – Talksport 2013, Sky Sports 2013, BBC Sport 2014–2015, ITV Sport 2015–present
- Bill McLaren – BBC Radio 1953–1959, BBC Sport 1959–2002
- Ugo Monye – BT Sport 2014–present, ITV Sport 2015–present, BBC Radio 5 Live 2015–present, BBC Sport 2022-present
- Brian Moore – BBC Sport 2002–present, talkSPORT 2011, 2013–2016, BBC Radio 5 Live 2015
- Nick Mullins – BBC Radio 5 Live 1995–2010, BBC Sport 1995–2010, ESPN 2010–2013, ITV Sport 2011 & 2015–present, BT Sport 2013–present,
- Geordan Murphy – ITV Sport 2015
- Jim Neilly – BBC Radio 1979–present, BBC Sport 1994–2003 (still commentates for BBC Northern Ireland)
- Andy Nicol – BBC Sport 1998–present, STV 2009, BT Sport 2014–present
- Grant Nisbett – TVNZ 1984–1996, Sky TV (NZ) 1996–present
- Brian O'Driscoll – BT Sport 2014–present, ITV Sport 2015–present
- François Pienaar – ITV Sport 1999–2019
- Keith Quinn – TVNZ 1971–2007 (now working as a freelance)
- Ian Robertson – BBC Radio 1972–1980, 1983–present
- Jason Robinson – ITV Sport 2015–present
- Jim Rosenthal – ITV Sport 1997–2007, OSN 2015
- Pierre Salviac – France Télévisions 1983–2005
- Bill Seward – NBC Rugby World Cup 2011
- Nigel Starmer-Smith – BBC Sport 1973–2002, ITV Sport 2003–2006
- John Taylor – ITV Sport 1991–2007, talkSPORT 2005 & 2011–2013
- Gareth Thomas – ITV Sport 2011–present
- Teddy Wakelam – BBC Sport 1927–1939
- Peter West – BBC Sport 1956–1986
- Jonny Wilkinson – Sky Sports 2014–present, ITV Sport 2015–present
- Rhodri Williams – Setanta Sports 2006–2009
- Shane Williams – BBC Sport 2012–present, Talksport 2013, BT Sport 2015–present, ITV Sport 2015–present, Channel 4 2018 – 2021, Premier Sports 2018–present
- Martyn Williams – BBC Sport 2012–2021, BBC Radio 5 Live 2012–present, Channel 4 2018–2021, Premier Sports 2018–present
- Keith Wood – BBC Sport 2002–2017, TV3 Ireland 2015
- Sir Clive Woodward – BBC Sport 2013–2015 & 2016, Sky Sports 2013–present, ITV Sport 2015–2023

== Snooker ==
- Mark Allen - BBC Sport 2022–present
- Stuart Bingham - BBC Sport 2026–present
- David Bobin – Sky Sports 2000
- Eddie Charlton – BBC Sport 1987–1994
- Matt Chilton – ITV Sport 2011
- Radzi Chinyanganya – BBC Sport 2019-2021, Matchroom Sport 2020, Eurosport/TNT Sport 2021–present
- Dominic Dale – BBC Sport 2004–2005, BBC Wales, Eurosport/Quest/TNT Sport 2016–present, ITV Sport 2020
- Steve Davis – ITV Sport 1999–2001, BBC Sport 2001–present
- Ken Doherty – BBC Sport 2007 & 2009–present, ITV Sport 2020-2025, Freesports 2020,
- Dougie Donnelly – BBC Sport 1993–2001
- Jill Douglas – ITV Sport 2013–2025
- Peter Drury – ITV Sport 1999–2001, 2010, 2013
- Mike Dunn – BBC Sport 2020
- Peter Ebdon – BBC Sport 2016
- Ray Edmonds – ITV Sport 1982–1989, BBC Sport 1990–2004
- Reanne Evans – BBC Sport 2019-2021 Eurosport/TNT Sport 2019–present
- Clive Everton – BBC Radio 1972–1978, BBC Sport 1978–2011, ITV Sport 1981, 2010, 2013–2019, Sky Sports 2009–2015
- Dave Farrar – BBC Sport 2020
- Jason Ferguson – Sky Sports 2000
- Neal Foulds – Sky Sports 2004–present, Eurosport/Quest 2004–present, BBC Sport 2004–2014, ITV Sport 2013–present
- Andy Goldstein – Sky Sports, Eurosport/Quest 2016–2021
- Terry Griffiths – BBC Sport 2002-2020
- Mike Hallett – BBC Sport 1996, Sky Sports 1999–2015, Eurosport/Quest 2005–2019
- Steven Hallworth - BBC Sport 2026–present, Channel 5 2026-present, TNT Sport - 2025–present
- Stephen Hendry – BBC Sport 2011–present, ITV Sport 2016–2025, Channel 5 2026-
- Alex Higgins – BBC Sport 1984
- Eamonn Holmes – BBC Sport 1990–1992
- David Icke – BBC Sport 1983–1990
- Hazel Irvine – BBC Sport 2001–present
- Seema Jaswal – Eurosport 2017, BBC Sport 2019–present
- Joe Johnson – BBC 2020, Eurosport
- Mark Johnston-Allen – Sky Sports
- Jack Karnehm – BBC Sport 1978–1994
- Peter Lines – BBC Sport 2020, ITV Sport 2020, Eurosport 2020, Freesports 2020
- Jack Lisowski - BBC Sport 2022–present
- Ted Lowe – BBC Sport 1946–1996, 1997 (seniors event)
- Des Lynam – BBC Sport 1981–1982
- Alan McManus - Eurosport 2017–present, ITV Sport 2013–2025, BBC Sport 2017–2021, Channel 5 2026-
- Jim Meadowcroft – BBC Sport 1984–1987, 1997–2000, ITV Sport
- Jason Mohammad – BBC Sport 2013–2018 & 2020
- Shaun Murphy – BBC Sport 2018–2026, Freesports 2020
- Colin Murray – Eurosport/Quest 2015–2021
- Ronnie O'Sullivan – ITV Sport 2010–2011, Eurosport/Quest 2015–present
- John Parrott – BBC Sport 2001–present
- Joe Perry – ITV Sport 2018 & 2020, BBC Sport 2020-, Channel 5 2026-
- Rishi Persad - BBC 2007-2013 & 2022–present, ITV
- John Pulman – BBC Sport 1979–1982, ITV Sport 1981-1993
- George Riley – BBC Sport 2015–2017 (only at World Snooker Championship)
- Neil Robertson - BBC Sport 2024–present
- Vera Selby – BBC Sport 1982
- Katie Shanahan - Channel 5 2026-
- Matt Smith – BBC Sport 2000–2001, ITV Sport 2010–2011, 2014, Eurosport 2016–present
- John Spencer – BBC Sport 1978–1998
- Matthew Stevens - Channel 5 2026-
- Ray Stubbs – BBC Sport 2002–2009
- David Taylor - ITV Sport 1982- 198?
- Dennis Taylor – BBC Sport 1993–present, ITV Sport 1982-1993 & 2011, Eurosport/Quest 2016
- Willie Thorne – BBC Sport 1998- 2020, Sky Sports 1994–2013
- David Vine – BBC Sport 1978–2000
- John Virgo – BBC Sport 1985–2026
- Rob Walker – BBC Sport 2008–present (Tournament MC and BBC Reporter, Commentator 2016, 2020), ITV Sport 2015–present, YouTube 2016–2019, 2021
- Mike Watterson – Eurosport 1989-, Sky Sports – 1991–1994
- Jimmy White – BBC Sport 2010, Eurosport/Quest 2015–present
- Mark Wildman – ITV 1983-2000, Eurosport 2002–2004, Sky Sports 2002–2004
- Rex Williams – BBC Sport 1980–1984, ITV Sport 1984-1993
- Kyren Wilson - BBC Sport 2022–present
- Jim Wych – Sky Sports 1990–1997

== Squash ==
- Joey Barrington

== Sumo ==
- Dewanishiki Tadao – NHK 1990–1999
- Kitanofuji Katsuaki – NHK 1998–present
- Mainoumi Shūhei – NHK 2000–present
- Wakanohana Masaru – AbemaTV 2019–present

== Swimming ==
- Gerry Collins – ABC (Aus) 1988–present
- Dennis Cometti – Channel Seven 1986–2002, 2007–present, Nine Network 2002–2007
- Sharron Davies – BBC Sport 1996–present
- Rowdy Gaines – NBC 1996–present
- Anthony Hudson – Network Ten 2009–2011
- Andy Jameson – BBC Sport 1989–present
- Peter Jones – BBC Radio 1968–1988
- Nicole Livingstone – Nine Network 1996–2008, Network Ten 2009–present
- Bruce McAvaney – Seven Network 1980–1983, 1989–present, Network Ten 1983–1989
- Adrian Moorhouse – BBC Sport 1998–present
- James Parrack – Eurosport 2001–present
- Stephen Quartermain – Network Ten 2012
- Mark Tewksbury – CBC
- Ray Warren – Nine Network 1990–2012

== Tennis ==
- Andre Agassi – TNT 2025–present, BBC Sport 2025-present (Wimbledon semis onwards)
- Lucie Ahl – Eurosport 2005–2012
- Dylan Alcott - Nine Network 2019–present
- John Alexander OAM – Channel Seven 1987–2010, BBC Sport 1990–2005
- Vassos Alexander – BBC Radio 2003, 2012–2018
- Qasa Alom – BBC Sport 2023–present
- Rex Alston – BBC Radio 1946–1960
- Vijay Amritraj – Star Sports 1993–2017, BBC Sport 1999–2019, Fox Sports
- Brian Anderson - TNT 2025–present
- Julie Anthony – CBS 1976–1984
- Arthur Ashe – CBS 1976, ABC Sports 1980–1992, HBO 1981–1992
- Tracy Austin – CBS 1991–2014, BBC Sport 1999–2000, 2003–present, Seven Network 2006–2019, Tennis Channel 2010–present
- Richard Bacon – BBC Radio 2010–2012
- Chris Bailey – Sky Sports 1995–2007, BBC Sport 1995–2010
- Clare Balding – BBC Radio 5 Live 1995–2012, 2014, BBC Sport 2015–present
- Sue Barker – Channel Seven 1985–1989, BSB 1990 (BSB merged with Sky November 1990), Sky Sports 1991–1993, BBC Sport 1993–2022
- John Barrett – BBC Sport 1971–2006, Channel Nine 1980–1986, Channel Seven 1987–2007, USA Network 1988–1989, BSB 1990 (BSB merged with Sky November 1990), Sky Sports 1991, Tennis Channel 2003–2006
- Marion Bartoli – ITV Sport 2015–2021, BBC Sport 2014–2015, BBC Radio 2014–present
- Ashleigh Barty - BBC Sport 2024–present
- Jeremy Bates – BBC Radio 2012–present
- Boris Becker – BBC Sport 1998 (1 match), 2002–2013 & 2017–2021, Sky Sports 2011–2013, Eurosport
- James Blake - ESPN 2020–present
- Nick Bollettieri – BBC Radio 2012–2016
- Björn Borg – BBC Sport 1983, NBC 1983
- Eugenie Bouchard – BBC Sport 2026–present
- James Bracey - Nine Network 2019–present
- Naomi Broady - BBC Radio 2017, 2021–present
- Don Budge – NBC 1953–1960
- Elise Burgin – USA network 1992-?, Sky Sports c.1999-c.2006
- Darren Cahill – ESPN 2007–present
- Mary Carillo – USA Network 1980–1987, PBS 1981–1986, CBS 1986-2014, ESPN 1988–1997, 2003–2010, HBO 1996–1999, NBC 1996–2024
- Harry Carpenter – BBC Sport 1967–1993
- Pat Cash – BBC Sport 1997–present, BBC Radio 5 Live 2004–present
- Andrew Castle – Sky Sports 1992–2000, 2011–2018, BBC Sport 2002–2026, Eurosport 2011–present, BBC Radio 2021
- Naomi Cavaday - BBC Radio 2016–present
- Alf Chave – BBC Radio 1957-1971, Channel Two (Australia) 1957-1970
- Gillian Clark – BBC Sport 1999, Eurosport
- Kim Clijsters – BBC Radio 2018–present
- David Coleman – BBC Sport 1960–1969
- Bud Collins – NBC 1964, 1972–2007, CBS 1968–1972, ESPN 2007–2009, Tennis Channel 2007–2009
- Jimmy Connors – NBC 1990–1991, BBC Sport 2005–2007, 2014, Tennis Channel 2009–present, Amazon Prime 2018
- Àlex Corretja - Eurosport 2017–present
- Andrew Cotter – BBC Sport 2008–present
- Jim Courier – CBS 2003–2014, Seven Network 2005–2018, ITV Sport 2012–2021, BBC Sport 2016, Amazon Prime 2018-2022, Nine Network 2019–present, Tennis Channel, TNT 2025–present
- Barry Cowan – Sky Sports 2002–2018
- Mark Cox – BBC Sport 1977–2015
- Annabel Croft – BBC Sport 2002–2010 & 2014–present, BBC Radio 5 Live 2000–present, Sky Sports 2007–2018, Eurosport 1999–present, ITV Sport 2010–2021
- Rob Curling – Eurosport 2009–2018
- Lindsay Davenport – BBC Sport 2010–2016, ITV Sport 2013–2016, Tennis Channel, TNT 2025–present
- Barry Davies – BBC Sport 1979, 1981–2018
- Donald Dell – Channel Seven 1978–1981, NBC 1979–1983
- Casey Dellacqua - Nine Network 2020–present
- Chris Dittmar – Seven Network 2005–2019
- Jelena Dokic - Nine Network 2019–present
- Katherine Downes - BBC Sport 2016–present
- Cliff Drysdale – CBS 1977, ESPN 1979–2025 (ABC Sports), Channel Four 1988
- Jo Durie – Eurosport 1995–present, BBC Sport 1995–2026
- Maurice Edelston – BBC Radio 1961–1975
- Kyle Edmund – BBC Sport 2026–present
- Dick Enberg – NBC 1978–2000, CBS 2000–2011, 2014, ESPN 2004–2016
- Richard Evans – BBC Sport 1981-1983, BBC Radio 1984-2003
- Chris Evert – NBC 1990–2003, BBC Sport 2002, ESPN 2011–present, Eurosport 2015-present
- David Felgate – BBC Radio 2001–2002, 2010–present
- Mary Joe Fernández – ESPN 2000–present, CBS 2005-2014
- John Fitzgerald - Channel Seven 1996-2018
- Peter Fleming – Sky Sports 1995–2018, BBC Sport 1999–present, Eurosport
- Ken Fletcher – BBC Sport 1978
- Keith Fordyce – BBC Sport 1967–1968
- Chris Fowler – ESPN 2004–present
- Neale Fraser – BBC Sport 1980, 1999 (1 match)
- Russell Fuller – BBC Radio 2001–present
- Vitas Gerulaitis – CBS, USA 1988–1994
- Brad Gilbert – BBC Radio 2002, ESPN 2004–present
- Raymond Glendenning – BBC Radio 1945–1963, BBC Sport 1950–1951
- Jason Goodall – Eurosport 2002–present, BBC Radio 2003, BBC Sport 2004–2014, ESPN 2015–present, Tennis Channel
- Johanna Griggs - Channel Seven 1994-1997, 2001-2014
- Freddie Grisewood – BBC Sport 1937–1955, BBC Radio 1937–1948
- Sam Groth - Nine Network 2019-2022
- Tony Gubba – BBC Sport 1980s
- Isa Guha – BBC Sport 2022–present (co-anchor 2023–present)
- Brett Haber – ESPN 1994–1998; Tennis Channel 2003-Present
- Miles Harrison – BBC Radio 1993–1996, Sky Sports 1995
- Julie Heldman - CBS 1973-1978, NBC 1975-1977, HBO 1978
- Tim Henman – BBC Sport 2008–present, Amazon Prime 2019-2023, Sky Sports 2023–present, Eurosport 2023–present, TNT 2025-present
- Bob Hewitt – Eurosport 1994–2008
- Lleyton Hewitt – BBC Sport 2016, Seven Network 2010–18, Nine Network 2019–present
- Dan Hicks - NBC 2019-2023
- Celina Hinchcliffe – BBC Sport 2005–2011, 2017–2018, ITV Sport 2012–2021
- Lynsey Hipgrave – BT Sport 2013–2019
- Eamonn Holmes – BBC Sport 1992
- Bob Howe – BBC Radio 1972–1988
- Anthony Hudson – Seven Network 2001
- Joyce Hume – BBC Radio 1982–1998
- Paul Hutchins – BBC Sport 1986–1995
- David Icke – BBC Sport 1987
- Mike Ingham – BBC Radio 1982–1989
- John Inverdale – BBC Radio 1987–2001, 2013, BBC Sport 1998, 2000–2023, ITV Sport 2011–2021
- Goran Ivanišević – BBC Radio 2013–2018
- Luke Jensen – ESPN 1994–present, BBC Radio 1998–2001, Tennis Channel
- Ann Jones – BBC Sport 1970–2005, CBS 1971–1972
- Charlie Jones– NBC 1983–1992
- C. M. Jones – BBC Sport 1949-1951
- Emlyn Jones – ITV Sport 1956-1968, BBC Sport 1970-1971
- Peter Jones – BBC Radio 1975–1988
- Phil Jones – BBC Sport 1994, 2003–2017
- Roz Kelly - Nine Network 2022–present
- Anne Keothavong – BBC Sport 2013–present, BT Sport 2013–2019, ITV Sport 2019–2021
- Billie Jean King – ABC Sports 1976-?, CBS 1978, NBC 1979-, HBO 1984–1999, Channel Four 1988
- Billy Knight – BBC Sport 1968–1976
- Robbie Koenig – Various
- Johanna Konta - BBC Sport 2022–present, Sky Sports 2023–present
- Richard Krajicek – BBC Radio 2012–2016
- Jack Kramer – NBC 1954–1962, BBC Sport 1960–1973, 1976 & 1996 (1 match), ABC 1965–1973, CBS 1968–1973
- Nick Kyrgios - Eurosport 2024 BBC Sport 2024
- Jim Lampley – HBO 1988–1999
- Peter Landy – Channel Seven 1978–1999
- David Law – BBC Radio 5 Live 2002–present, BT Sport 2013-2019
- Henri Leconte - Channel Seven 2010-2018
- Adam Lefkoe - TNT 2025–present
- Tony Livesey – BBC Radio 2017–2022
- David Lloyd – BBC Radio 1979–2004
- John Lloyd – HBO 1993–1999, BBC Sport 2000–2026, BBC Radio 2004–2005, ITV Sport 2009–2011
- Colin Long – Channel Seven 1973–1977
- Feliciano López – BBC Sport 2022–2023
- Des Lynam – BBC Sport 1981–1999, BBC Radio 1978–1981, BBC Radio 5 Live 2005
- Bill Macatee – USA Network 1990–1994, CBS 1995–2014, Tennis Channel
- Barry MacKay – HBO 1983–1999, USA Network 1984–2008, Fox Sports, Tennis Channel 2003–2011
- Miles Maclagan – BBC Radio 2015–present
- Rebecca Maddern - Nine Network 2019-2021
- Dan Maskell – BBC Radio 1949–1951, BBC Sport 1951–1991
- Geoff Masters - Channel Seven 2010-2018
- Wally Masur – Sky Sports 1996–1999, Channel Seven 1998–1999, etc.
- Simon Mayo – BBC Radio 5 Live 2003–2009
- Nick McArdle - Nine Network 2023–present
- Bruce McAvaney – Channel Seven 1990–2016
- Clare McDonnell - BBC Radio 2023–present
- Chris McKendry - ESPN 2010–present
- John McEnroe – NBC (inc. USA network) 1991-2024, CBS 1991-2014, Eurosport 1997, 2015–present, BBC Sport 2000–present, ESPN 2005, 2009–present, Channel Nine 2019–present, TNT 2025-present
- Patrick McEnroe – ESPN 1995–present, CBS 1997–2014, TNT 2025–present
- Hamish McLachlan – Seven Network 2008–18
- Frew McMillan – BBC Radio 1984–2014, Sky Sports 1991–1996, Eurosport 1992–2021
- Peter McNamara – BBC Radio 1995–2001
- David Mercer – BBC Radio 1984–1992, BBC Sport 1992–2020, Eurosport 1992–2014, USA Network 1995, Sky Sports 1996, BT Sport 2013–2019
- John Millman - Nine Network 2024–present
- Alison Mitchell - BBC Radio 2013–present
- Alicia Molik - Nine Network 2019–present
- John Motson – BBC Sport 1973, BBC Radio 1976–1981
- Tony Mottram – BBC Radio 1961–1968
- Nick Mullins – BBC Radio 2001–present, BBC Sport 2012–present, ITV Sport 2012–2021, BT Sport 2013–2019
- Andy Murray – BBC Sport 2018 (1 match)
- Brent Musburger – CBS 1976–1989
- Jim Nantz – CBS 1987–1995
- Martina Navratilova – HBO 1995–1999, BBC Sport 1999–present (not all years), Amazon Prime 2019-2023, Sky Sports 2023-present, Tennis Channel
- John Newcombe – Channel Seven 1977, 2011-2019, NBC 1977–1978, CBS 1978–1987, Channel Nine
- Jana Novotná – BBC Sport 2000–2001, BBC Radio 2008–2017
- Pat O'Brien – CBS 1981–1997, 2006
- Eleanor Oldroyd – BBC Radio 2010–2018
- Jonathan Overend – BBC Radio 5 Live 1999–2013, 2017–present, BBC Sport 2011–2016, Sky Sports 2023-present
- Bud Palmer – NBC 1953–1959
- Fred Perry – BBC Sport 1951–1952, ITV Sport 1956–1968, BBC Radio 1959–1994
- Rishi Persad - BBC Sport 2005–present
- Mark Petchey – BBC Sport 1999–present, Sky Sports 1999–2018, Eurosport 2000–present, ITV Sport 2012–2021, Amazon Prime 2018-2023, TNT 2025–present, Tennis Channel
- Mary Pierce – BBC Radio 2014–2017
- Louise Pleming – ABC 1998–2016, ESPN Star 2004–2014, BBC Sport 2005–present, Fox Sports 2000–2010, Tennis Channel 2008–2010, 2015–present, Channel Seven 2015
- Barbara Potter – BBC Radio 1989–1996, Sky Sports 1995-c.1998and
- Sam Querrey - TNT 2025–present, Tennis Channel
- Roger Rasheed - Channel Seven 2007-2018
- Simon Reed - Channel Four 1984-1988, Eurosport 1991–present, BBC Sport 2000-present
- Garry Richardson – BBC Sport 1995–2016
- Steve Rider – BBC Sport 1985–1986, 1998
- Sandy Roberts - Channel Seven 1980-2013
- Max Robertson – ABC (Aus) 1937–1939, BBC Radio 1946–1986
- Ted Robinson – NBC (inc. USA network) 1987–2018, Tennis Channel 2007–present
- Laura Robson – BBC Radio 2014–present, Eurosport 2022–present, Sky Sports 2023–present, TNT 2025-present
- Andy Roddick – BBC Sport 2015, Tennis Channel
- Helen Rollason – BBC Sport 1990–1992
- Chanda Rubin – BBC Sport & BBC Radio 2018–present, Tennis Channel
- Greg Rusedski – Eurosport 2007–present, BBC Sport 2007–2012, Sky Sports 2008–2018, Amazon Prime 2019-2023
- Tim Ryan – CBS 1978–1997
- Gigi Salmon - BBC Radio 2012–present, BBC Sport 2017–present, Sky Sports 2023–present
- Fabrice Santoro – ITV Sport 2012–2021
- Barbara Schett – Eurosport 2010–present, BBC Radio 2012–present
- Frank Sedgman – Various Australian TV channels 1960–1976
- Leif Shiras – Sky Sports 2002–2018, Tennis Channel
- Pam Shriver – CBS 1997–2014, BBC Sport 1990–2011, Channel Seven 1995–2001, HBO 1999, ESPN 1990–present, Tennis Channel
- Jim Simpson – ABC 1964, NBC 1965–1978
- Leon Smith – BBC Radio 2015–present
- Samantha Smith BBC Sport 2002–present, ITV Sport 2012–2021, BT Sport 2013–2019, Channel Seven, Nine Network 2019–present
- Stan Smith – NBC 1984–1992
- Liz Smylie – BBC Sport 2005–present
- Jeff Stelling – BBC Radio 1985–1988
- Alexandra Stevenson - ESPN 2019–present
- Michael Stich – BBC Radio 5 Live 2000–2012, BBC Sport 1999 (1 match), 2003–2012
- Fred Stolle – Channel Nine, ESPN, Fox Sports
- Allan Stone – Channel Seven 1978–2015, Tennis Channel
- Samantha Stosur - Nine Network 2023–present
- Rennae Stubbs - Channel Seven 2011-2018, ESPN 2017-present, Tennis Channel
- Pat Summerall – CBS 1972–1993
- Bill Talbert – NBC 1959–1971
- Jeff Tarango – BBC Radio 5 Live 2007–present, ITV Sport 2011
- Georgie Thompson – Sky Sports 2004-c.2011
- Barry Tompkins – HBO 1980–1987, Tennis Channel
- Tony Trabert – CBS 1972–2003, Nine Network 1985–2004
- Christine Truman – BBC Radio 1975–2006
- Wendy Turnbull – Channel Seven 1988–1997, BBC Radio 1997–2004
- David Vine – BBC Sport 1967–1982
- Virginia Wade – CBS 1977–1985, BBC Sport 1981–2015, USA Network 1993–1996
- Teddy Wakelam – BBC Radio 1927–1939
- Bea Walter – BBC Radio 1961-1973
- Peter West – BBC Sport 1953–1982
- Mats Wilander – Eurosport 2006–present, BBC Radio 2017–present, TNT 2025–present
- Chris Wilkinson – Eurosport 2005–present, ITV Sport 2012–2014
- Gerald Williams – BBC Radio 1975–1983, BBC Sport 1981–1989, BSB 1990 (BSB merged with Sky November 1990), Sky Sports 1991–2001
- Michael Williamson – Channel Seven 1973–1977
- Todd Woodbridge – Channel Seven 2006–2018, BBC Radio 2006–2010, Nine Network 2019–present, BBC Sport 2019–present
- Mark Woodforde – Channel Nine 2002–2010, ESPN 2010–present, BBC Radio 2011–present, Fox Sports
- Caroline Wozniacki - ESPN 2020–present, Tennis Channel 2020–present
- Basil Zempilas – Channel Seven 2008–2018

== Miscellaneous ==
- John Anderson – ESPN 1999–present, Talksport 2009–present
- Wade Barrett – WWE 2020–present
- Chris Berman – ESPN 1979–present, ABC (US) 1996–present
- Eric Bischoff – WCW 1991–1996
- Frank Bough – BBC Sport 1964–1982, ITV Sport 1991
- James Brown – CBS 1985–1993, Fox 1994–2006, CBS 2006–present
- Tiffany Cherry – Fox Footy 2002–2006 ESPN 2007 –present
- Matt Chilton – Eurosport 1992–present, BBC Sport 1995–present, ITV Sport 2011
- Jonathan Coachman – WWE 1999–2008, ESPN 2009–present
- Linda Cohn – ESPN 1992–present
- Michael Cole – WWE 1997–present
- Bob Costas – NBC 1980–present
- Dickie Davies – ITV Sport 1965–1989, Eurosport 1991
- Rece Davis – ESPN 1995–present
- Anne Doyle – WJBK (CBS-TV in Detroit) 1978–1983, and pioneering female sports broadcaster in the U.S.
- Rich Eisen – ESPN 1996–2003, NFL Network 2003–present
- Dick Enberg – NBC 1975–2000, CBS 2000–2014
- Marty Glickman
- Corey Graves – WWE 2016–present
- Greg Gumbel – ESPN 1979–1988, CBS 1988–1993, NBC 1994–1997, CBS 1998–present
- Tom Hammond – NBC 1984–present
- Gary Imlach – Channel 4 1990–2001, 2010, ITV Sport 2002–present
- John Inverdale – BBC Radio 1986–present, Sky Sports 1990–1991, BBC Sport 1994–present, ITV Sport 2011–present
- Hazel Irvine – ITV Sport 1987–1990, BBC Sport 1990–present
- Ernie Johnson Jr. – Turner Sports 1989–present
- Vic Joseph – WWE 2017–present
- Jim Lampley – ABC (US) 1974–1987, CBS 1987–1992, NBC 1992–
- Jerry "The King" Lawler – WWE 1993–2024
- Steve Levy – ESPN 1993–present
- Bob Ley – ESPN 1979–present
- Des Lynam – BBC Radio 1969–1981, 2004–2005, BBC Sport 1977–1999, ITV Sport 1999–2004, Setanta Sports 2007–2009
- Bill Macatee – NBC 1982–1990, CBS 1990–present
- Sean McDonough – CBS 1990–2000, ABC (US) 2000–present
- Jimmy Magee – RTÉ Radio 1 1962–present, RTÉ Sport 1962–present
- Pat McAfee – WWE 2021–present
- Nigel McGuinness – Ring of Honor 2011-2012, 2023, WWE 2016-2022, AEW 2023–present
- Vince McMahon – WWE 1972–1997
- Al Michaels – ABC (US) 1977–2006, NBC 2006–present
- Brent Musburger – CBS 1975–1990, ABC (US) 1990–present
- Jim Nantz – CBS 1985–present, BBC 2010–2012
- Pat O'Brien – CBS 1981–2000, NBC 2000–present
- "Mean Gene" Okerlund – WWE 1984–1993, WCW 1993–2001, WWE 2001–2019
- Keith Olbermann – ESPN 1992–1997, 2013–present, Fox Sports Net 1998–2001, NBC 2007–2010
- Eleanor Oldroyd – BBC Radio 5 Live 1994–present
- Nick Owen – ITV Sport 1986–1992
- Dan Patrick – ESPN 1989–2007, NBC 2008–present
- Kevin Patrick –WWE 2022–2024
- Ian Payne – BBC Radio 1988–2003, Sky Sports 2003–2010, LBC 2010–present, BBC Radio 2010–present, ITV News 2013–present
- Mark Pougatch – BBC Radio 5 Live 1994–present, BBC Sport 2004–2005, ITV Sport 2012–present, Channel 5 2011–present
- Sam Quek – BBC 2021
- Steve Rider – ITV 1980–1985, 2006–present, BBC Sport 1985–2005, Sky Sports 2012–present
- Sandy Roberts – Seven Network 1980–present
- Jim Rosenthal – BBC Radio 1977–1980, ITV Sport 1980–2011, Channel 5 2010–2012, Boxnation 2011–present
- Jim Ross – WWE 1993–2013, 2017–2019 AEW All Elite Wrestling 2019–present
- Mark Saggers – BBC Radio 1989–1992, Sky Sports 1992–2001, BBC Radio 5 Live 2001–2009, talkSport 2009–present
- John Saunders – 1986–present
- Byron Saxton – WWE 2012–present
- Chris Schenkel – DuMont 1952–1956, CBS 1956–1965, ABC 1965–1997
- Tony Schiavone – WWE 1989–1990, WCW 1991–2001 AEW All Elite Wrestling 2019–present
- Stuart Scott – ESPN 1993–2015
- Dan Shulman – TSN 1995–2007, ESPN 2001–present
- Jimmy Smith – WWE 2021–2022
- Hannah Storm – CNN 1989–1992, NBC 1992–2002, ESPN 2008–present
- Joey Styles – ECW 1993–2001, WWE 2005–2008
- Tazz – WWE 2000–2009, TNA 2009–2015 AEW All Elite Wrestling 2019–present
- Mike Tenay – WCW 1994–2001, TNA 2002–2016
- Joe Tessitore – ESPN 2002–present
- Mike Tirico – ESPN 1991–present, ABC (US) 1996–2016, NBC 2016–present
- Scott Van Pelt – The Golf Channel 1994–2000, ESPN 2001–present
- Percy Watson – WWE 2016-2019
- Whit Watson – ESPN 1997–2003, Sun Sports 2003–present
- Alan Weeks – BBC Sport 1952–1996
- Don West – TNA 2002–2009
- Jeanne Zelasko – Fox Sports Net 1996–2001, Fox 2001–2008

== See also ==
- Broadcasting of sports events
