= Katie Shanahan (TV presenter) =

English TV Presenter

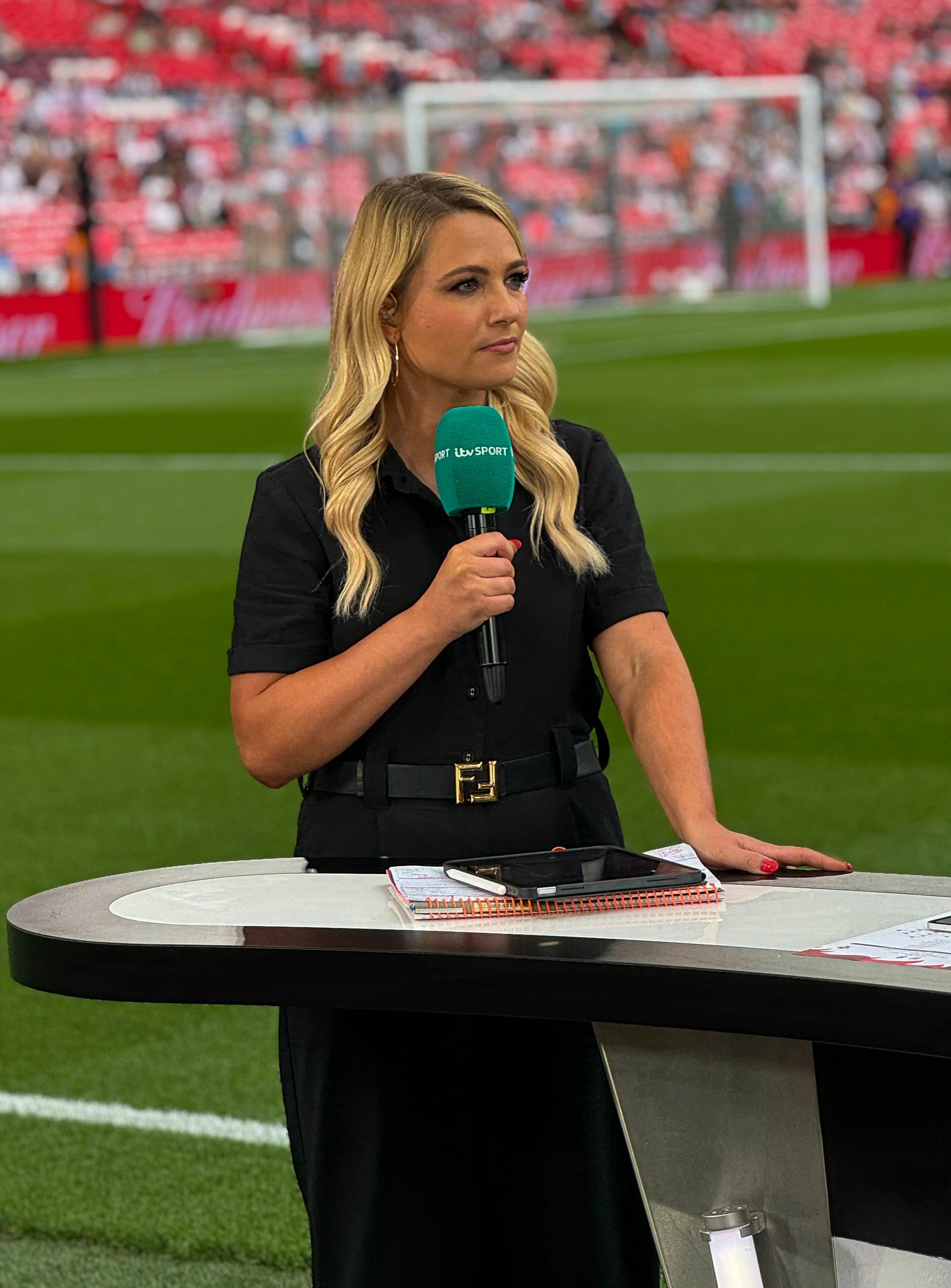
- Born: 20 December 1991 (age 34)
- Website: https://www.katieshanahan.co.uk/television

Katie Shanahan (born 20 December 1991) is an English television and radio sports presenter and former field hockey player. She has worked with major broadcasters including Sky Sports, BBC Sport, ITV Sport, Channel 5, talkSPORT and Fox Sports

== Early life and education ==
Shanahan played field hockey internationally for England for five years. She later earned a distinction in a master's degree in Sports Journalism.

In her twenties, Shanahan suffered a career ending injury when a hockey ball smashed into her head, fracturing her skull. This led to extensive plastic surgery to correct the facial bones that had moved out of place. She then had six months of spinal reconstruction and never played hockey again.

== Career ==
=== UK broadcasting ===
Shanahan began her media career working in production roles before moving into on-air work with two of the biggest UK channels, BBC Sport and Sky Sports.

She is now a regular reporter for ITV Sport, and has served on major football tournaments, including the 2023 FIFA Women's World Cup and the UEFA Women's Euro 2025..

Shanahan is a regular host of the weekly EFL Highlights Show on ITV.

She is also the host of professional snooker on ITV and Channel 5.

Shanahan is a presenter for talkSPORT and currently hosts Early Sports Breakfast and the Breakfast Show.

=== International broadcasting ===
After a brief stint on the CBS Sports Golazo Network, Shanahan was one of Fox Sports' reporters for the 2026 FIFA World Cup in the United States, Canada and Mexico.

Shanahan has also presented for Stan in Australia since 2021 including the 2026 Champions League Final in Budapest, and Optus Sport Australia, covering the 2023 Women's World Cup and Men's UEFA Euro 2024.

=== Entertainment ===
Shanahan made her debut hosting the UK's Strongest Man for Channel 5, listed in The Times culture section under “What to watch this week!”

=== Awards ===
- Sports Journalism Awards - Winner - Best Event of the Year - World Cup Final - ITV
- Broadcast Sport Awards - Winner - Best Production of the Year (Quadrennial) 2025 Euros for Lionesses coverage
- Broadcast Sport Awards - Nominated - Best Sports Reporter
