= Alfred Cecil Chave =

Australian tennis player

Alfred Cecil Chave (1905 - 1971) was an Australian tennis player, administrator, journalist and broadcaster.

Chave was born on 16 August 1905 in Brisbane. He was the second child of Alfred Edward Chave, a fruit merchant from New South Wales, and his English-born wife Mabel (née Fursey). He was educated at Wynnum Primary and Brisbane State High schools before joining the family fruit-business.

As an amateur tennis player, Chave competed in many tournaments in Australia in the 1920s and 1930s. In 1925 he was ranked number one junior in Queensland. On 29 July 1926 he married South African-born Raby Marie Llewellyn Davies. In 1933 he won South coast championships, playing "sparkling tennis" to beat Hugh Goodwin in the final. His career continued into the early 1950s, when Chave was well into his forties.

From 1928, Chave was a council member of the Queensland Lawn Tennis Association. He was a founding member in 1932 of the Umpires' Association (later the Queensland Lawn Tennis Umpires' Association) and was a selector from 1939 to 1969. When U. S. played Belgium at Milton, Brisbane, in 1957 he became the first Queenslander to referee a Davis Cup inter-zone final. He was also manager to some of the Australian teams in Europe. In 1962, Chave was accused of breaking the rules when he spoke to Margaret Smith (Court) offering "courtside encouragement" during her Italian championships final with Maria Bueno. Chave (along with the captain of the Brazilian team) sat in a compound behind the umpire's chair during the match.

Chave's career as a journalist began in 1930, when he began writing columns for the Brisbane Telegraph. By the end of his life, Chave had a reputation in Australia as being 'the Voice of Tennis'. He was a commentator on BBC radio for the Wimbledon championships from the late 1950s until his death in 1971. He also commentated on Australian television.

After his first marriage ended in divorce, Chave married Patricia Mary Sutherland (née Johansson) on 24 September 1949. He died of myocardial infarction on 15 August 1971 aged 65. In 1972 the clubhouse at Milton, Brisbane (which hosted the Australian championships that were held in Brisbane) was named after him.
