= Anthony McCrossan =

British cycling commentator

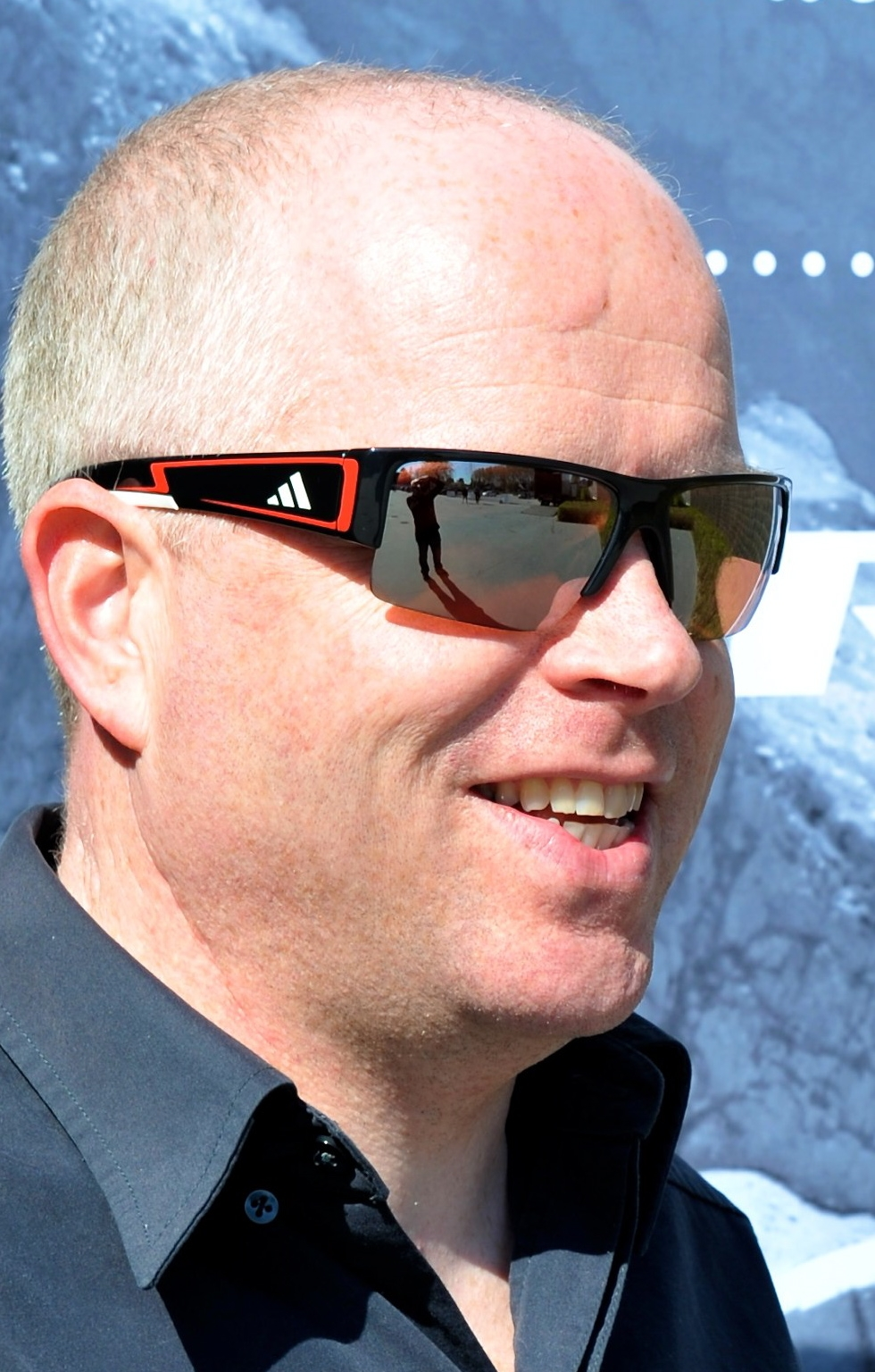
- Born: Anthony Hugh McCrossan; 16 April 1969 (age 57)
- Occupations: Sports commentator; Journalist; Master of ceremonies
- Years active: 1980s–present
- Employers: Cyclevox; Voxwomen

Anthony Hugh McCrossan (born 16 April 1969) is a British sports commentator covering professional cycling.

Having started cycling in 1982 after watching the World Road Race Championships at Goodwood in England, Anthony has been commentating for over 18 years at live events, on television and major cycle shows.

Most recently, in addition to being MC and commentating at the 2012 Olympic road race, time trials, and track events, Anthony made history by becoming the first English speaking commentator at Milan–San Remo, the 95th Giro d'Italia and il Lombardia.

He has commentated live, covering races such as the Tour De France, Tour De France Femmes, Giro d’Italia, Vuelta a España, Tour of California and every major classic including Paris–Roubaix, Tour of Flanders, Liege Bastogne Liege, Amstel Gold, Milan–San Remo, as well as the World Road and Track Championships.

In 2010 he was lead commentator on the first ever live broadcast of the British National Road Race Championships on Eurosport.

Since the launch of Team Sky, Anthony has been a cycling expert for Sky News and Sky Sports News. In 2010 he appeared in the studio of Sky News and worked on location at the Tour De France with Orla Chennaoui.

Between 2007 and 2009 Anthony commentated on the nightly coverage of the Tour of Britain for ITV4, as well as being the MC at the event start and the on-course announcer for six years.

McCrossan lives in Southampton and travels internationally working at cycling events and is the regular choice as MC of team launches. He is also heard at major cycling events including the UCI Track World Cup, The Nocturne Series, The Tour of Britain and The Tour Series as an announcer and MC.
