= Anna Woolhouse =

British sports journalist and presenter (born 1984)

- Born: Anna Elizabeth Woolhouse; 19 January 1984 (age 42); Market Deeping, England, UK
- Education: Leeds University
- Occupation: TV presenter
- Employer: Sky Sports

Anna Woolhouse (born 19 January 1984) is a British sports journalist and presenter, who has been working for Sky Sports since 2012. She is the lead boxing presenter for the network, and has covered many high-profile fights, such as Anthony Joshua vs. Alexander Povetkin, Dillian Whyte vs. Alexander Povetkin, and Anthony Joshua vs. Andy Ruiz Jr. She has also interviewed many boxing stars, such as Anthony Joshua, Lennox Lewis, and Tony Bellew. She has a BA Honours degree in music from Leeds University, and a postgraduate degree in broadcast journalism from the same institution.

== Career ==
She started her career as a radio presenter, and then joined Sky Sports as an ice hockey reporter. She has also hosted shows on other sports, such as W Series, rugby league, darts and basketball.

Woolhouse has interviewed, among many others, world heavyweight champion Anthony Joshua following the first loss in his professional boxing career to Andy Ruiz Jr., in 2019.

In April of 2026, it was announced Woolhouse would be joining DAZN to be a part of their British boxing broadcasts.
