= List of Belmont Stakes broadcasters =

The following is a list of national American television networks and announcers who have broadcast Belmont Stakes.

The Belmont Stakes has been televised nationally since 1948, starting with CBS in 1948 and 1949, and again from 1953 to 1985; ABC from 1986 to 2000 and again from 2006 to 2010; NBC from 1950 to 1952, 2001 to 2005, and most recently 2011 to 2022; and Fox starting in 2023 with its current deal set to expire through the 2030 Belmont.

== Television ==
=== 2020s ===
Year	Network	Race caller	Hosts	Analysts	Reporters	Trophy presentation
2026	Fox	Frank Mirahmadi	Curt Menefee and Charissa Thompson	Tom Amoss, Richard Migliore, Chris Fallica and Jonathon Kinchen	Tom Rinaldi and Maggie Wolfendale	Charissa Thompson
2025	Fox	Frank Mirahmadi	Curt Menefee and Charissa Thompson	Tom Amoss, Richard Migliore, Chris Fallica and Jonathon Kinchen	Tom Rinaldi and Maggie Wolfendale	Charissa Thompson
2024	Fox	Frank Mirahmadi	Curt Menefee and Charissa Thompson	Tom Amoss, Richard Migliore, Chris Fallica and Jonathon Kinchen	Tom Rinaldi and Maggie Wolfendale	Charissa Thompson
2023	Fox	Tom Durkin	Curt Menefee and Charissa Thompson	Tom Amoss, Mike Smith and Chris Fallica	Tom Rinaldi and Maggie Wolfendale	Charissa Thompson
2022	NBC	Larry Collmus	Mike Tirico	Randy Moss, Jerry Bailey and Matt Bernier	Kenny Rice, Ahmed Fareed and Britney Eurton	Ahmed Fareed and Britney Eurton
2021	NBC	Larry Collmus	Mike Tirico	Randy Moss, Jerry Bailey and Eddie Olczyk	Kenny Rice, Donna Barton Brothers, Laffit Pincay, III, Ahmed Fareed, Britney Eurton, Nick Luck and Steve Kornacki	Ahmed Fareed and Britney Eurton
2020	NBC	Larry Collmus	Mike Tirico	Randy Moss, Jerry Bailey and Eddie Olczyk	Kenny Rice and Britney Eurton	Britney Eurton

==== Notes ====
- In 2022, Fox Sports announced a deal to carry the Belmont Stakes from 2023 through 2030.

=== 2010s ===
Year	Network	Race caller	Hosts	Analysts	Reporters	Trophy presentation
2019	NBC	Larry Collmus	Mike Tirico	Randy Moss, Jerry Bailey and Eddie Olczyk	Kenny Rice, Donna Barton Brothers, Laffit Pincay, III, Ahmed Fareed, Britney Eurton and Nick Luck	Laffit Pincay, III and Britney Eurton
2018	NBC	Larry Collmus	Bob Costas and Mike Tirico	Randy Moss, Jerry Bailey, Eddie Olczyk and Britney Eurton	Kenny Rice, Donna Barton Brothers, Laffit Pincay, III and Carolyn Manno	Bob Costas and Laffit Pincay, III
2017	NBC	Larry Collmus	Bob Costas and Mike Tirico	Randy Moss, Jerry Bailey, Bob Neumeier and Eddie Olczyk	Kenny Rice, Donna Barton Brothers, Laffit Pincay, III and Carolyn Manno	Bob Costas and Laffit Pincay, III
2016	NBC	Larry Collmus	Bob Costas and Tom Hammond	Randy Moss, Jerry Bailey, Bob Neumeier and Eddie Olczyk	Kenny Rice, Donna Barton Brothers, Laffit Pincay, III and Carolyn Manno	Bob Costas and Laffit Pincay, III
2015	NBC	Larry Collmus	Bob Costas and Tom Hammond	Randy Moss, Jerry Bailey, Bob Neumeier and Eddie Olczyk	Kenny Rice, Donna Barton Brothers, Laffit Pincay, III, Josh Elliott and Carolyn Manno	Bob Costas and Josh Elliott
2014	NBC	Larry Collmus	Bob Costas and Tom Hammond	Randy Moss, Jerry Bailey, Bob Neumeier and Mike Battaglia	Kenny Rice, Donna Barton Brothers, Laffit Pincay, III, Josh Elliott and Carolyn Manno	Bob Costas and Josh Elliott
2013	NBC	Larry Collmus	Bob Costas and Tom Hammond	Randy Moss, Jerry Bailey, Bob Neumeier and Mike Battaglia	Kenny Rice, Donna Barton Brothers, Laffit Pincay, III and Michelle Beadle	Bob Costas and Laffit Pincay, III
2012	NBC	Larry Collmus	Bob Costas and Tom Hammond	Gary Stevens, Randy Moss, Bob Neumeier and Mike Battaglia	Kenny Rice, Donna Barton Brothers and Laffit Pincay, III	Bob Costas
2011	NBC	Larry Collmus	Bob Costas and Tom Hammond	Gary Stevens, Bob Neumeier and Mike Battaglia	Kenny Rice, Donna Barton Brothers and Randy Moss	Bob Costas
2010	ABC	Tom Durkin	Joe Tessitore and Kenny Mayne	Randy Moss, Jerry Bailey and Hank Goldberg	Jeannine Edwards, Jay Privman, Steve Cyphers, Tom Rinaldi and Caton Bredar	Tom Rinaldi and Jeannine Edwards

==== Notes ====
- In 2011, NBC Sports once again became the broadcaster of all three Triple Crown races in separate broadcast deals; including an extension to its existing rights to the Kentucky Derby and Preakness Stakes, plus establishing a new 5-year deal to broadcast the Belmont Stakes after ABC and ESPN declined to renew their previous contract. All three deals lasted through 2015, and included supplementary coverage on NBC Sports Network for all three races. The additional coverage included 14-1/2 hours of Kentucky Derby pre-race coverage including an hour and a half live special for the Kentucky Oaks and six and a half hours of Preakness Stakes pre-race coverage including a one-hour live special on the Black-Eyed Susan Stakes both carried on NBC Sports Network.

=== 2000s ===
Year	Network	Race caller	Hosts	Analysts	Reporters	Trophy presentation
2009	ABC	Tom Durkin	Joe Tessitore and Kenny Mayne	Randy Moss, Jerry Bailey, Hank Goldberg and Rick Reilly	Jeannine Edwards, Rece Davis, Jay Privman, Steve Cyphers, Tom Rinaldi and Caton Bredar	Rece Davis and Jeannine Edwards
2008	ABC	Tom Durkin	Brent Musburger, Joe Tessitore and Kenny Mayne	Randy Moss, Jerry Bailey, Hank Goldberg and Rick Reilly	Jeannine Edwards, Rece Davis, Jay Privman, Steve Cyphers, Tom Rinaldi, Pat Forde and Caton Bredar	Rece Davis and Jeannine Edwards
2007	ABC	Tom Durkin	Brent Musburger, Chris Fowler and Kenny Mayne	Randy Moss, Jerry Bailey and Hank Goldberg	Jeannine Edwards, Rece Davis, Joe Tessitore and Caton Bredar	Rece Davis and Jeannine Edwards
2006	ABC	Tom Durkin	Brent Musburger, Terry Gannon and Kenny Mayne	Randy Moss, Jerry Bailey and Hank Goldberg	Jeannine Edwards, Quint Kessenich, Jeremy Schaap, Tom Rinaldi and Thea Andrews	Brent Musburger and Jeannine Edwards
2005	NBC	Tom Durkin	Bob Costas and Tom Hammond	Charlsie Cantey, Bob Neumeier and Mike Battaglia	Kenny Rice and Donna Barton Brothers	Bob Costas and Mike Battaglia
2004	NBC	Tom Durkin	Bob Costas and Tom Hammond	Charlsie Cantey, Bob Neumeier and Mike Battaglia	Kenny Rice and Donna Barton Brothers	Bob Costas and Mike Battaglia
2003	NBC	Tom Durkin	Bob Costas and Tom Hammond	Charlsie Cantey, Bob Neumeier and Mike Battaglia	Kenny Rice and Donna Barton Brothers	Bob Costas and Mike Battaglia
2002	NBC	Tom Durkin	Bob Costas and Tom Hammond	Charlsie Cantey, Bob Neumeier and Mike Battaglia	Kenny Rice and Donna Barton Brothers	Bob Costas and Mike Battaglia
2001	NBC	Tom Durkin	Bob Costas and Tom Hammond	Charlsie Cantey, Bob Neumeier and Mike Battaglia	Kenny Rice and Donna Barton Brothers	Bob Costas and Mike Battaglia
2000	ABC	Dave Johnson	Jim McKay and Al Michaels	Hank Goldberg and Dave Johnson	Charlsie Cantey, Lesley Visser and Robin Roberts	Jim McKay and Charlsie Cantey

==== Notes ====
- Combined broadcast arrangements with ABC continued until 2001, when NBC Sports took over. Under NBC, ratings continued to go up, by as much as 20 percent in some years. It did not hurt that many horses, like Funny Cide and Smarty Jones, were making Triple Crown runs during those years (although all of them failed). From 2002 to 2004, the Belmont had the highest ratings of any horse race on television.
  - After the 2004 race, the New York Racing Association ended its deal with NBC, citing a conflict over profit-sharing arrangements. ABC won the rights to the Belmont, and Triple Crown Productions was effectively dissolved related to bonuses and broadcast rights. The only function that Triple Crown Production still oversees is joint nomination fees and a small joint marketing effort.

=== 1990s ===
Year	Network	Race caller	Hosts	Analysts	Reporters	Trophy presentation
1999	ABC	Dave Johnson	Jim McKay and Al Michaels	Hank Goldberg and Dave Johnson	Charlsie Cantey, Lesley Visser and Robin Roberts	Jim McKay and Charlsie Cantey
1998	ABC	Dave Johnson	Jim McKay and Al Michaels	Hank Goldberg and Dave Johnson	Charlsie Cantey, Lesley Visser and Robin Roberts	Jim McKay and Charlsie Cantey
1997	ABC	Dave Johnson	Jim McKay and Al Michaels	Charlsie Cantey and Dave Johnson	Lesley Visser and Robin Roberts	Jim McKay
1996	ABC	Dave Johnson	Jim McKay and Al Michaels	Charlsie Cantey and Dave Johnson	Lesley Visser and Robin Roberts	Jim McKay
1995	ABC	Dave Johnson	Al Michaels	Charlsie Cantey and Dave Johnson	Jack Whitaker, Lesley Visser and Robin Roberts	Al Michaels
1994	ABC	Dave Johnson	Jim McKay and Al Michaels	Charlsie Cantey and Dave Johnson	Jack Whitaker, Lesley Visser and Robin Roberts	Jim McKay
1993	ABC	Dave Johnson	Jim McKay and Al Michaels	Charlsie Cantey, Dave Johnson and Steve Cauthen	Jack Whitaker and Robin Roberts	Jim McKay
1992	ABC	Dave Johnson	Jim McKay and Al Michaels	Charlsie Cantey and Dave Johnson	Jack Whitaker and Robin Roberts	Jim McKay
1991	ABC	Dave Johnson	Jim McKay and Al Michaels	Charlsie Cantey and Dave Johnson	Jack Whitaker and Robin Roberts	Jim McKay
1990	ABC	Dave Johnson	Jim McKay and Al Michaels	Charlsie Cantey and Dave Johnson	Jack Whitaker and Lynn Swann	Jim McKay

==== Notes ====
- Jim McKay missed the 1995 Belmont, electing to undergo heart bypass surgery.

=== 1980s ===
Year	Network	Race caller	Hosts	Analysts	Reporters	Trophy presentation
1989	ABC	Dave Johnson	Jim McKay and Al Michaels	Charlsie Cantey and Dave Johnson	Jack Whitaker and Lynn Swann	Jim McKay
1988	ABC	Dave Johnson	Jim McKay and Al Michaels	Charlsie Cantey and Dave Johnson	Jack Whitaker and Lynn Swann	Jim McKay
1987	ABC	Dave Johnson	Jim McKay and Al Michaels	Charlsie Cantey and Dave Johnson	Jack Whitaker and Lynn Swann	Jim McKay
1986	ABC	Marshall Cassidy	Jim McKay	Charlsie Cantey and Bill Hartack	Jack Whitaker and Lynn Swann	Jim McKay and Bill Hartack
1985	CBS	Marshall Cassidy	Brent Musburger	Frank I. Wright and Jimmy Snyder	Charlsie Cantey	Brent Musburger
1984	CBS	Marshall Cassidy	Brent Musburger	Frank I. Wright and Jimmy Snyder	Jim Kelly, Phyllis George, and Charlsie Cantey	Brent Musburger
1983	CBS	Marshall Cassidy	Brent Musburger	Frank I. Wright and Jimmy Snyder	Jim Kelly, Phyllis George, Charlsie Cantey, and John Madden	Brent Musburger
1982	CBS	Marshall Cassidy	Brent Musburger	Frank I. Wright and Jimmy Snyder	Jim Kelly, Phyllis George, and Charlsie Cantey	Brent Musburger
1981	CBS	Marshall Cassidy	Jack Whitaker	Frank I. Wright and Jimmy Snyder	Phyllis George and Charlsie Cantey	Jack Whitaker
1980	CBS	Marshall Cassidy	Jack Whitaker	Frank I. Wright and Jimmy Snyder	Phyllis George and Charlsie Cantey	Jack Whitaker

=== 1970s ===
Year	Network	Race caller	Hosts	Analysts	Reporters	Trophy presentation
1979	CBS	Marshall Cassidy	Jack Whitaker	Frank I. Wright and Jimmy Snyder	Phyllis George and Charlsie Cantey	Jack Whitaker
1978	CBS	Chic Anderson	Jack Whitaker	Frank I. Wright and Jimmy Snyder	Phyllis George and Charlsie Cantey	Jack Whitaker
1977	CBS	Chic Anderson	Jack Whitaker	Frank I. Wright and Jimmy Snyder	Phyllis George and Charlsie Cantey	Jack Whitaker
1976	CBS	Chic Anderson	Jack Whitaker	Heywood Hale Broun and Frank I. Wright	Phyllis George	Jack Whitaker
1975	CBS	Chic Anderson	Jack Whitaker	Heywood Hale Broun and Frank I. Wright	Phyllis George	Jack Whitaker
1974	CBS	Chic Anderson	Jack Whitaker	Heywood Hale Broun and Frank I. Wright	Heywood Hale Broun and Frank I. Wright	Jack Whitaker
1973	CBS	Chic Anderson	Jack Whitaker	Heywood Hale Broun and Frank I. Wright	Heywood Hale Broun and Frank I. Wright	Jack Whitaker
1972	CBS	Chic Anderson	Jack Whitaker	Heywood Hale Broun	Heywood Hale Broun and Pia Lindström	Jack Whitaker
1971	CBS	Chic Anderson	Jack Whitaker	Heywood Hale Broun and Frank I. Wright	Pia Lindström	Jack Whitaker
1970	CBS	Chic Anderson	Jack Whitaker	Heywood Hale Broun and Eddie Arcaro	Heywood Hale Broun	Jack Whitaker

=== 1960s ===
Year	Network	Race caller	Hosts	Analysts	Reporters	Trophy presentation
1969	CBS	Chic Anderson	Jack Whitaker	Heywood Hale Broun and Eddie Arcaro		Jack Whitaker
1968	CBS	Jack Drees	Jack Drees and Jack Whitaker			Jack Whitaker
1967	CBS	Jack Drees	Jack Drees and Jack Whitaker			Jack Whitaker
1966	CBS	Jack Drees	Jack Whitaker	Bryan Field		Jack Whitaker
1965	CBS	Jack Drees	Jack Drees and Jack Whitaker			Jack Whitaker
1964	CBS	Bryan Field	Jack Drees and Chris Schenkel			Jack Whitaker
1963	CBS	Bryan Field	Jack Drees and Chris Schenkel			Jack Drees
1962	CBS	Bryan Field	Chris Schenkel			Chris Schenkel
1961	CBS	Bryan Field	Chris Schenkel			Chris Schenkel
1960	CBS	Fred Capossela	Chris Schenkel			Chris Schenkel

=== 1950s ===
Year	Network	Race caller	Color commentator
1959	CBS	Fred Capossela	Bryan Field and Chris Schenkel
1958	CBS	Bryan Field	
1957	CBS	Fred Capossela	
1956	CBS	Fred Capossela	
1955	CBS	Fred Capossela	
1954	CBS	Bryan Field	
1953	CBS	Bryan Field	
1952	NBC	Bryan Field	
1951	NBC	Bryan Field	
1950	NBC	Bryan Field	

=== 1940s ===
Year	Network	Race caller	Color commentator
1949	CBS	Bryan Field	
1948	CBS	Bryan Field	
