= List of Preakness Stakes broadcasters =

The following is a list of national American television networks and announcers that have broadcast Preakness Stakes.

== Television ==
=== 2020s ===
Year	Network	Race caller	Hosts	Analysts	Reporters	Trophy presentation
2026	NBC	Larry Collmus	Ahmed Fareed	Randy Moss, Jerry Bailey and Matt Bernier	Kenny Rice, Donna Barton Brothers, Britney Eurton, Nick Luck and Steve Kornacki	Britney Eurton
2025	NBC	Larry Collmus	Mike Tirico	Randy Moss, Jerry Bailey and Matt Bernier	Kenny Rice, Donna Barton Brothers, Ahmed Fareed, Britney Eurton, Nick Luck and Steve Kornacki	Ahmed Fareed and Britney Eurton
2024	NBC	Larry Collmus	Mike Tirico	Randy Moss, Jerry Bailey and Matt Bernier	Kenny Rice, Donna Barton Brothers, Ahmed Fareed, Britney Eurton, Nick Luck, Jac Collinsworth and Steve Kornacki	Ahmed Fareed and Britney Eurton
2023	NBC	Larry Collmus	Mike Tirico	Randy Moss, Jerry Bailey and Matt Bernier	Kenny Rice, Donna Barton Brothers, Ahmed Fareed, Britney Eurton, Nick Luck and Steve Kornacki	Ahmed Fareed and Britney Eurton
2022	NBC	Larry Collmus	Mike Tirico	Randy Moss, Jerry Bailey and Matt Bernier	Kenny Rice, Donna Barton Brothers, Ahmed Fareed, Britney Eurton, Nick Luck and Steve Kornacki	Ahmed Fareed and Britney Eurton
2021	NBC	Larry Collmus	Mike Tirico	Randy Moss, Jerry Bailey and Eddie Olczyk	Kenny Rice, Donna Barton Brothers, Laffit Pincay, III, Ahmed Fareed, Britney Eurton, Nick Luck and Steve Kornacki	Ahmed Fareed and Britney Eurton
2020	NBC	Larry Collmus	Ahmed Fareed	Randy Moss, Jerry Bailey and Eddie Olczyk	Kenny Rice and Britney Eurton	Britney Eurton

=== 2010s ===
Year	Network	Race caller	Hosts	Analysts	Reporters	Trophy presentation
2019	NBC	Larry Collmus	Mike Tirico	Randy Moss, Jerry Bailey and Eddie Olczyk	Kenny Rice, Donna Barton Brothers, Laffit Pincay, III, Ahmed Fareed, Britney Eurton and Nick Luck	Laffit Pincay, III and Britney Eurton
2018	NBC	Larry Collmus	Bob Costas and Mike Tirico	Randy Moss, Jerry Bailey and Eddie Olczyk	Kenny Rice, Donna Barton Brothers, Laffit Pincay, III, Britney Eurton and Carolyn Manno	Bob Costas and Laffit Pincay, III
2017	NBC	Larry Collmus	Bob Costas and Mike Tirico	Randy Moss, Jerry Bailey, Bob Neumeier and Eddie Olczyk	Kenny Rice, Donna Barton Brothers, Laffit Pincay, III and Carolyn Manno	Bob Costas and Laffit Pincay, III
2016	NBC	Larry Collmus	Bob Costas and Tom Hammond	Randy Moss, Jerry Bailey, Bob Neumeier and Eddie Olczyk	Kenny Rice, Donna Barton Brothers, Laffit Pincay, III and Carolyn Manno	Bob Costas and Laffit Pincay, III
2015	NBC	Larry Collmus	Bob Costas and Tom Hammond	Randy Moss, Jerry Bailey, Bob Neumeier and Eddie Olczyk	Kenny Rice, Donna Barton Brothers, Laffit Pincay, III, Josh Elliott and Carolyn Manno	Bob Costas and Josh Elliott
2014	NBC	Larry Collmus	Bob Costas and Tom Hammond	Randy Moss, Jerry Bailey, Bob Neumeier and Mike Battaglia	Kenny Rice, Donna Barton Brothers, Laffit Pincay, III, Josh Elliott and Carolyn Manno	Bob Costas and Josh Elliott
2013	NBC	Larry Collmus	Bob Costas and Tom Hammond	Randy Moss, Jerry Bailey, Bob Neumeier and Mike Battaglia	Kenny Rice, Donna Barton Brothers, Laffit Pincay, III and Michelle Beadle	Bob Costas and Laffit Pincay, III
2012	NBC	Larry Collmus	Tom Hammond	Gary Stevens, Randy Moss, Bob Neumeier and Mike Battaglia	Kenny Rice, Donna Barton Brothers and Laffit Pincay, III	Laffit Pincay, III
2011	NBC	Larry Collmus	Bob Costas and Tom Hammond	Gary Stevens, Bob Neumeier and Mike Battaglia	Kenny Rice, Donna Barton Brothers and Randy Moss	Bob Costas
2010	NBC	Tom Durkin	Bob Costas and Tom Hammond	Gary Stevens, Bob Neumeier and Mike Battaglia	Kenny Rice and Donna Barton Brothers	Bob Costas and Mike Battaglia

=== 2000s ===
Year	Network	Race caller	Hosts	Analysts	Reporters	Trophy presentation
2009	NBC	Tom Durkin	Bob Costas and Tom Hammond	Gary Stevens, Bob Neumeier and Mike Battaglia	Kenny Rice and Donna Barton Brothers	Bob Costas and Mike Battaglia
2008	NBC	Tom Durkin	Bob Costas and Tom Hammond	Gary Stevens, Bob Neumeier and Mike Battaglia	Kenny Rice and Donna Barton Brothers	Bob Costas and Mike Battaglia
2007	NBC	Tom Durkin	Bob Costas and Tom Hammond	Gary Stevens, Bob Neumeier and Mike Battaglia	Kenny Rice and Donna Barton Brothers	Bob Costas and Mike Battaglia
2006	NBC	Tom Durkin	Bob Costas and Tom Hammond	Gary Stevens, Bob Neumeier and Mike Battaglia	Kenny Rice and Donna Barton Brothers	Bob Costas and Mike Battaglia
2005	NBC	Tom Durkin	Bob Costas and Tom Hammond	Charlsie Cantey, Bob Neumeier and Mike Battaglia	Kenny Rice and Donna Barton Brothers	Bob Costas and Mike Battaglia
2004	NBC	Tom Durkin	Bob Costas and Tom Hammond	Charlsie Cantey, Bob Neumeier and Mike Battaglia	Kenny Rice and Donna Barton Brothers	Bob Costas and Mike Battaglia
2003	NBC	Tom Durkin	Bob Costas and Tom Hammond	Charlsie Cantey, Bob Neumeier and Mike Battaglia	Kenny Rice and Donna Barton Brothers	Bob Costas and Mike Battaglia
2002	NBC	Tom Durkin	Bob Costas and Tom Hammond	Charlsie Cantey, Bob Neumeier and Mike Battaglia	Kenny Rice and Donna Barton Brothers	Bob Costas and Mike Battaglia
2001	NBC	Tom Durkin	Bob Costas and Tom Hammond	Charlsie Cantey, Bob Neumeier and Mike Battaglia	Kenny Rice and Donna Barton Brothers	Bob Costas and Mike Battaglia
2000	ABC	Dave Johnson	Jim McKay and Al Michaels	Hank Goldberg and Dave Johnson	Charlsie Cantey, Lesley Visser and Robin Roberts	Jim McKay and Charlsie Cantey

=== 1990s ===
Year	Network	Race caller	Hosts	Analysts	Reporters	Trophy presentation
1999	ABC	Dave Johnson	Jim McKay and Al Michaels	Hank Goldberg and Dave Johnson	Charlsie Cantey, Lesley Visser and Robin Roberts	Jim McKay and Charlsie Cantey
1998	ABC	Dave Johnson	Jim McKay and Al Michaels	Hank Goldberg and Dave Johnson	Charlsie Cantey, Lesley Visser and Robin Roberts	Jim McKay and Charlsie Cantey
1997	ABC	Dave Johnson	Jim McKay and Al Michaels	Charlsie Cantey and Dave Johnson	Lesley Visser and Robin Roberts	Jim McKay
1996	ABC	Dave Johnson	Jim McKay and Al Michaels	Charlsie Cantey and Dave Johnson	Lesley Visser and Robin Roberts	Jim McKay
1995	ABC	Dave Johnson	Al Michaels	Charlsie Cantey, Dave Johnson	Jack Whitaker, Lesley Visser and Robin Roberts	Al Michaels
1994	ABC	Dave Johnson	Jim McKay and Al Michaels	Charlsie Cantey and Dave Johnson	Jack Whitaker, Lesley Visser and Robin Roberts	Jim McKay
1993	ABC	Dave Johnson	Jim McKay and Al Michaels	Charlsie Cantey, Dave Johnson and Steve Cauthen	Jack Whitaker and Robin Roberts	Jim McKay
1992	ABC	Dave Johnson	Jim McKay and Al Michaels	Charlsie Cantey and Dave Johnson	Jack Whitaker and Robin Roberts	Jim McKay
1991	ABC	Dave Johnson	Jim McKay and Al Michaels	Charlsie Cantey and Dave Johnson	Jack Whitaker and Robin Roberts	Jim McKay
1990	ABC	Dave Johnson	Jim McKay and Al Michaels	Charlsie Cantey and Dave Johnson	Jack Whitaker and Lynn Swann	Jim McKay

==== Notes ====
- Jim McKay missed the 1995 Preakness Stakes due to heart surgery.

=== 1980s ===
Year	Network	Race caller	Hosts	Analysts	Reporters	Trophy presentation
1989	ABC	Dave Johnson	Jim McKay and Al Michaels	Charlsie Cantey and Dave Johnson	Jack Whitaker and Lynn Swann	Jim McKay
1988	ABC	Dave Johnson	Jim McKay and Al Michaels	Charlsie Cantey and Dave Johnson	Jack Whitaker and Lynn Swann	Jim McKay
1987	ABC	Dave Johnson	Jim McKay and Al Michaels	Charlsie Cantey and Dave Johnson	Jack Whitaker and Lynn Swann	Jim McKay
1986	ABC	Mike Battaglia	Jim McKay and Al Michaels	Charlsie Cantey, Dave Johnson and Bill Hartack	Jack Whitaker and Lynn Swann	Jim McKay
1985	ABC	Dave Johnson	Jim McKay	Bill Hartack	Howard Cosell and Jack Whitaker	Jim McKay
1984	ABC	Dave Johnson	Jim McKay	Bill Hartack	Howard Cosell and Jack Whitaker	Jim McKay
1983	ABC	Dick Woolley	Jim McKay	Bill Hartack	Howard Cosell and Jack Whitaker	Jim McKay
1982	ABC	Dave Johnson	Jim McKay		Howard Cosell and Jack Whitaker	Jim McKay
1981	ABC	Dick Wooley	Jim McKay	Eddie Arcaro	Howard Cosell	Jim McKay and Howard Cosell
1980	ABC	Dick Wooley	Jim McKay	Eddie Arcaro	Howard Cosell	Jim McKay and Howard Cosell

=== 1970s ===
Year	Network	Race caller	Hosts	Analysts	Reporters	Trophy presentation
1979	ABC	Dick Wooley	Jim McKay	Eddie Arcaro	Howard Cosell	Jim McKay and Howard Cosell
1978	ABC	Dick Wooley	Jim McKay	Eddie Arcaro	Howard Cosell and Chris Schenkel	Jim McKay and Howard Cosell
1977	ABC	Dick Wooley	Jim McKay	Eddie Arcaro	Howard Cosell	Jim McKay and Howard Cosell
1976	CBS	Chic Anderson	Jack Whitaker	Heywood Hale Broun and Frank I. Wright	Phyllis George	Jack Whitaker
1975	CBS	Chic Anderson	Jack Whitaker	Heywood Hale Broun and Frank I. Wright	Phyllis George	Jack Whitaker
1974	CBS	Chic Anderson	Jack Whitaker	Heywood Hale Broun and Frank I. Wright		Jack Whitaker
1973	CBS	Chic Anderson	Jack Whitaker	Heywood Hale Broun and Frank I. Wright		Jack Whitaker
1972	CBS	Chic Anderson	Jack Whitaker	Heywood Hale Broun and Frank I. Wright	Pia Lindström	Jack Whitaker
1971	CBS	Chic Anderson	Jack Whitaker	Heywood Hale Broun and Frank I. Wright	Pia Lindström	Jack Whitaker
1970	CBS	Chic Anderson	Jack Whitaker	Heywood Hale Broun and Eddie Arcaro		Jack Whitaker

- In 1977, ABC was awarded the contract to televise the Preakness. Triple Crown Productions was formed in 1985 after CBS terminated its contract with NYRA. ABC Sports won the rights to broadcast all three races, as well as many prep races. Ratings went up after the package was centralized.

=== 1960s ===
Year	Network	Race caller	Hosts	Analysts	Reporters	Trophy presentation
1969	CBS	Chic Anderson	Jack Whitaker	Heywood Hale Broun and Eddie Arcaro		Jack Whitaker
1968	CBS	Jack Drees	Jack Drees and Jack Whitaker			Jack Whitaker
1967	CBS	Jack Drees	Jack Drees and Jack Whitaker			Jack Whitaker
1966	CBS	Bryan Field	Jack Drees and Jack Whitaker	Eddie Arcaro		Jack Whitaker
1965	CBS	Bryan Field	Jack Drees and Jack Whitaker	Eddie Arcaro	Gil Stratton	Jack Whitaker
1964	CBS	Bryan Field	Jack Drees and Chris Schenkel			Jack Whitaker
1963	CBS	Bryan Field	Jack Drees and Chris Schenkel	Eddie Arcaro		Jack Drees
1962	CBS	Bryan Field	Chris Schenkel		Gil Stratton	Chris Schenkel
1961	CBS	Bryan Field	Chris Schenkel			Chris Schenkel
1960	CBS	Fred Capossela	Chris Schenkel			Chris Schenkel

=== 1950s ===
Year	Network	Race caller	Color commentator	Reporter
1959	CBS	Fred Capossela	Bryan Field and Chris Schenkel	
1958	CBS	Fred Capossela	Bryan Field	Chris Schenkel
1957	CBS	Fred Capossela	Chris Schenkel	
1956	CBS	Fred Capossela	Mel Allen	
1955	CBS	Fred Capossela	Win Elliot	Phil Sutterfield
1954	CBS	Fred Capossela	Mel Allen and Sam Renick	
1953	CBS	Bryan Field		
1952	CBS	Bryan Field		
1951	CBS	Bryan Field		
1950	CBS	Bryan Field		

=== 1940s ===
Year	Network	Race caller	Color commentator
1949	CBS	Bryan Field	
