= List of Kentucky Derby broadcasters =

The following is a list of national American television networks and announcers that have broadcast Kentucky Derby. The race has been broadcast nationally since 1952, starting on CBS from 1952 to 1974, then ABC from 1975 to 2000, and its current home NBC since 2001.

On May 16, 1925, the first live radio broadcast of the Kentucky Derby was originated by WHAS and was also carried by WGN in Chicago. On May 7, 1949, the first television coverage of the Kentucky Derby took place, produced by WAVE-TV, the NBC affiliate in Louisville. This coverage was aired live in the Louisville market and sent to NBC as a kinescope newsreel recording for national broadcast. This broadcast was the first time Zoomar lenses were used on a broadcast TV sports show. On May 3, 1952, the first national television coverage of the Kentucky Derby took place, aired from then-CBS affiliate WHAS-TV. In 1954, the purse exceeded $100,000 for the first time.

== Television ==
=== 2020s ===
Year	Network	Race caller	Hosts	Analysts	Reporters	Trophy presentation
2026	NBC	Larry Collmus	Mike Tirico and Rebecca Lowe	Randy Moss, Jerry Bailey, Eddie Olczyk and Matt Bernier	Kenny Rice, Donna Barton Brothers, Ahmed Fareed, Britney Eurton, Nick Luck, John Fanta, Dylan Dreyer, Steve Kornacki and Zanna Roberts Rassi	Rebecca Lowe and Ahmed Fareed
2025	NBC	Larry Collmus	Mike Tirico, Ahmed Fareed and Rebecca Lowe	Randy Moss, Jerry Bailey, Eddie Olczyk and Matt Bernier	Kenny Rice, Donna Barton Brothers, Britney Eurton, Nick Luck, Dylan Dreyer and Steve Kornacki	Rebecca Lowe and Britney Eurton
2024	NBC	Larry Collmus	Mike Tirico and Rebecca Lowe	Randy Moss, Jerry Bailey, Eddie Olczyk and Matt Bernier	Kenny Rice, Donna Barton Brothers, Ahmed Fareed, Britney Eurton, Nick Luck, Dylan Dreyer, Steve Kornacki and Zanna Roberts Rassi	Rebecca Lowe and Ahmed Fareed
2023	NBC	Larry Collmus	Mike Tirico and Rebecca Lowe	Randy Moss, Jerry Bailey, Eddie Olczyk and Matt Bernier	Kenny Rice, Donna Barton Brothers, Ahmed Fareed, Britney Eurton, Nick Luck, Dale Earnhardt Jr., Dylan Dreyer, Sanya Richards-Ross, Steve Kornacki and Matthew Berry	Rebecca Lowe and Ahmed Fareed
2022	NBC	Larry Collmus	Mike Tirico and Rebecca Lowe	Randy Moss, Jerry Bailey and Eddie Olczyk	Kenny Rice, Donna Barton Brothers, Ahmed Fareed, Britney Eurton, Nick Luck, Rutledge Wood, Dale Earnhardt Jr., Dylan Dreyer, Zanna Roberts Rassi and Steve Kornacki	Rebecca Lowe and Ahmed Fareed
2021	NBC	Larry Collmus	Mike Tirico	Randy Moss, Jerry Bailey and Eddie Olczyk	Kenny Rice, Donna Barton Brothers, Laffit Pincay III, Ahmed Fareed, Britney Eurton, Nick Luck, Jac Collinsworth, Sanya Richards-Ross and Steve Kornacki	Ahmed Fareed and Britney Eurton
2020	NBC	Larry Collmus	Mike Tirico	Randy Moss, Jerry Bailey and Eddie Olczyk	Kenny Rice, Donna Barton Brothers, Laffit Pincay III, Britney Eurton and Rutledge Wood	Kenny Rice and Britney Eurton

==== Notes ====
- Mike Tirico stepped away during the 2025 Kentucky Derby due to a nut allergy reaction, Ahmed Fareed filled in for Tirico for the rest of the telecast.

=== 2010s ===
Year	Network	Race caller	Hosts	Analysts	Reporters	Trophy presentation
2019	NBC	Larry Collmus	Mike Tirico and Rebecca Lowe	Randy Moss, Jerry Bailey and Eddie Olczyk	Kenny Rice, Donna Barton Brothers, Laffit Pincay III, Britney Eurton, Nick Luck, Rutledge Wood, Dale Earnhardt Jr., Dylan Dreyer and Von Miller	Rebecca Lowe and Britney Eurton
2018	NBC	Larry Collmus	Bob Costas and Mike Tirico	Randy Moss, Jerry Bailey and Eddie Olczyk	Kenny Rice, Donna Barton Brothers, Laffit Pincay III, Britney Eurton, Carolyn Manno, Rutledge Wood, Dylan Dreyer, Johnny Weir and Tara Lipinski	Bob Costas and Laffit Pincay III
2017	NBC	Larry Collmus	Bob Costas and Mike Tirico	Randy Moss, Jerry Bailey, Bob Neumeier and Eddie Olczyk	Kenny Rice, Donna Barton Brothers, Laffit Pincay III, Carolyn Manno, Rutledge Wood and Dylan Dreyer	Bob Costas and Laffit Pincay III
2016	NBC	Larry Collmus	Bob Costas and Tom Hammond	Randy Moss, Jerry Bailey, Bob Neumeier and Eddie Olczyk	Kenny Rice, Donna Barton Brothers, Laffit Pincay III, Carolyn Manno, Rutledge Wood, Johnny Weir and Tara Lipinski	Bob Costas and Laffit Pincay III
2015	NBC	Larry Collmus	Bob Costas and Tom Hammond	Randy Moss, Jerry Bailey, Mike Battaglia and Eddie Olczyk	Kenny Rice, Donna Barton Brothers, Laffit Pincay III, Josh Elliott, Carolyn Manno, Johnny Weir and Tara Lipinski	Bob Costas and Josh Elliott
2014	NBC	Larry Collmus	Bob Costas and Tom Hammond	Randy Moss, Jerry Bailey, Bob Neumeier and Mike Battaglia	Kenny Rice, Donna Barton Brothers, Laffit Pincay III, Josh Elliott, Carolyn Manno, Johnny Weir and Tara Lipinski	Bob Costas and Josh Elliott
2013	NBC	Larry Collmus	Bob Costas and Tom Hammond	Randy Moss, Jerry Bailey, Bob Neumeier and Mike Battaglia	Kenny Rice, Donna Barton Brothers, Laffit Pincay III, Michelle Beadle and Coco Rocha	Bob Costas and Laffit Pincay III
2012	NBC	Larry Collmus	Bob Costas and Tom Hammond	Gary Stevens, Randy Moss, Bob Neumeier and Mike Battaglia	Kenny Rice, Donna Barton Brothers, Laffit Pincay III, Jenna Wolfe and Catt Sadler	Bob Costas and Laffit Pincay III
2011	NBC	Larry Collmus	Bob Costas and Tom Hammond	Gary Stevens, Bob Neumeier and Mike Battaglia	Kenny Rice, Donna Barton Brothers, Randy Moss, Maria Menounos, and Jenna Wolfe	Bob Costas and Randy Moss
2010	NBC	Tom Durkin	Bob Costas and Tom Hammond	Gary Stevens, Bob Neumeier and Mike Battaglia	Kenny Rice, Donna Barton Brothers, Natalie Morales and Jim Cantore (weather)	Bob Costas and Mike Battaglia

- In 2014, NBC renewed its broadcast agreement with Churchill Downs through 2025.

=== 2000s ===
Year	Network	Race caller	Hosts	Analysts	Reporters	Trophy presentation
2009	NBC	Tom Durkin	Bob Costas and Tom Hammond	Gary Stevens, Mike Battaglia and Kenny Rice	Kenny Rice and Donna Barton Brothers	Bob Costas and Mike Battaglia
2008	NBC	Tom Durkin	Bob Costas and Tom Hammond	Gary Stevens, Bob Neumeier and Mike Battaglia	Kenny Rice and Donna Barton Brothers	Bob Costas and Mike Battaglia
2007	NBC	Tom Durkin	Bob Costas and Tom Hammond	Gary Stevens, Bob Neumeier and Mike Battaglia	Kenny Rice and Donna Barton Brothers	Bob Costas and Mike Battaglia
2006	NBC	Tom Durkin	Bob Costas and Tom Hammond	Gary Stevens, Bob Neumeier and Mike Battaglia	Kenny Rice and Donna Barton Brothers	Bob Costas and Mike Battaglia
2005	NBC	Tom Durkin	Bob Costas and Tom Hammond	Charlsie Cantey, Bob Neumeier and Mike Battaglia	Kenny Rice and Donna Barton Brothers	Bob Costas and Mike Battaglia
2004	NBC	Tom Durkin	Bob Costas and Tom Hammond	Charlsie Cantey, Bob Neumeier and Mike Battaglia	Kenny Rice, Donna Barton Brothers and Melissa Stark	Bob Costas and Mike Battaglia
2003	NBC	Tom Durkin	Bob Costas and Tom Hammond	Charlsie Cantey, Bob Neumeier and Mike Battaglia	Kenny Rice and Donna Barton Brothers	Bob Costas and Charlsie Cantey
2002	NBC	Tom Durkin	Bob Costas and Tom Hammond	Charlsie Cantey, Bob Neumeier and Mike Battaglia	Kenny Rice and Donna Barton Brothers	Bob Costas and Mike Battaglia
2001	NBC	Tom Durkin	Bob Costas and Tom Hammond	Charlsie Cantey, Bob Neumeier and Mike Battaglia	Kenny Rice and Donna Barton Brothers	Bob Costas and Charlsie Cantey
2000	ABC	Dave Johnson	Jim McKay and Al Michaels	Hank Goldberg and Dave Johnson	Charlsie Cantey, Lesley Visser and Robin Roberts	Jim McKay and Charlsie Cantey

=== 1990s ===
Year	Network	Race caller	Hosts	Analysts	Reporters	Trophy presentation
1999	ABC	Dave Johnson	Jim McKay and Al Michaels	Hank Goldberg and Dave Johnson	Charlsie Cantey, Lesley Visser and Robin Roberts	Jim McKay and Charlsie Cantey
1998	ABC	Dave Johnson	Jim McKay and Al Michaels	Hank Goldberg, Dave Johnson and Mike E. Smith	Charlsie Cantey, Lesley Visser and Robin Roberts	Jim McKay and Charlsie Cantey
1997	ABC	Dave Johnson	Jim McKay and Al Michaels	Charlsie Cantey, Dave Johnson and Chris McCarron	Lesley Visser and Robin Roberts	Jim McKay
1996	ABC	Dave Johnson	Jim McKay and Al Michaels	Charlsie Cantey and Dave Johnson	Lesley Visser and Robin Roberts	Jim McKay
1995	ABC	Dave Johnson	Jim McKay and Al Michaels	Charlsie Cantey and Dave Johnson	Jack Whitaker, Lesley Visser and Robin Roberts	Jim McKay
1994	ABC	Dave Johnson	Jim McKay and Al Michaels	Charlsie Cantey and Dave Johnson	Jack Whitaker, Lesley Visser and Robin Roberts	Jim McKay
1993	ABC	Dave Johnson	Jim McKay and Al Michaels	Charlsie Cantey, Dave Johnson and Steve Cauthen	Jack Whitaker and Robin Roberts	Jim McKay
1992	ABC	Dave Johnson	Jim McKay and Al Michaels	Charlsie Cantey and Dave Johnson	Jack Whitaker and Robin Roberts	Jim McKay
1991	ABC	Dave Johnson	Jim McKay and Al Michaels	Charlsie Cantey and Dave Johnson	Jack Whitaker and Robin Roberts	Jim McKay
1990	ABC	Dave Johnson	Jim McKay and Al Michaels	Charlsie Cantey and Dave Johnson	Jack Whitaker and Lynn Swann	Jim McKay

=== 1980s ===
Year	Network	Race caller	Hosts	Analysts	Reporters	Trophy presentation
1989	ABC	Dave Johnson	Jim McKay and Al Michaels	Charlsie Cantey and Dave Johnson	Jack Whitaker and Lynn Swann	Jim McKay
1988	ABC	Dave Johnson	Jim McKay and Al Michaels	Charlsie Cantey and Dave Johnson	Jack Whitaker and Lynn Swann	Jim McKay
1987	ABC	Dave Johnson	Jim McKay and Al Michaels	Charlsie Cantey and Dave Johnson	Jack Whitaker and Lynn Swann	Jim McKay
1986	ABC	Mike Battaglia	Jim McKay and Al Michaels	Charlsie Cantey and Bill Hartack	Jack Whitaker and Lynn Swann	Jim McKay
1985	ABC	Mike Battaglia	Jim McKay	Bill Hartack	Howard Cosell and Jack Whitaker	Jim McKay
1984	ABC	Mike Battaglia	Jim McKay	Bill Hartack	Howard Cosell and Jack Whitaker	Jim McKay
1983	ABC	Mike Battaglia	Jim McKay	Bill Hartack	Howard Cosell, Frank Gifford, and Jack Whitaker	Jim McKay
1982	ABC	Mike Battaglia	Jim McKay	John M. Veitch	Howard Cosell and Jack Whitaker	Jim McKay
1981	ABC	Mike Battaglia	Jim McKay	Eddie Arcaro	Howard Cosell	Jim McKay and Howard Cosell
1980	ABC	Dave Johnson	Jim McKay	Eddie Arcaro	Howard Cosell	Jim McKay and Howard Cosell

- In 1985, a group of people wanted to increase the stature of the Triple Crown on television. Other than the Kentucky Derby, the Preakness Stakes and Belmont Stakes were considered the two "other" races. ABC Sports, which had broadcast the Derby since 1975, wanted to televise all the races as a three race package. CBS Sports, which showed the other two races, had much lower ratings for them, with the possible exceptions of years in which the Crown was at stake like 1973, 1977, and 1978.

=== 1970s ===
Year	Network	Race caller	Hosts	Analysts	Reporters	Trophy presentation
1979	ABC	Dave Johnson	Jim McKay	Eddie Arcaro	Howard Cosell	Jim McKay and Howard Cosell
1978	ABC	Dave Johnson	Jim McKay	Eddie Arcaro and Howard Cosell	Howard Cosell and Chris Schenkel	Jim McKay and Howard Cosell
1977	ABC	Chic Anderson	Jim McKay	Eddie Arcaro and Howard Cosell	Howard Cosell	Jim McKay and Howard Cosell
1976	ABC	Chic Anderson	Chris Schenkel and Jim McKay	Howard Cosell	Howard Cosell	Jim McKay and Howard Cosell
1975	ABC	Chic Anderson	Chris Schenkel and Jim McKay	John Rotz and Howard Cosell	Howard Cosell	Jim McKay and Howard Cosell
1974	CBS	Chic Anderson	Jack Whitaker	Heywood Hale Broun and Frank I. Wright	Heywood Hale Broun and Frank I. Wright	Jack Whitaker
1973	CBS	Chic Anderson	Jack Whitaker	Heywood Hale Broun and Frank I. Wright	Heywood Hale Broun and Frank I. Wright	Jack Whitaker
1972	CBS	Chic Anderson	Jack Whitaker	Heywood Hale Broun and Frank I. Wright	Heywood Hale Broun and Pia Lindström	Jack Whitaker
1971	CBS	Chic Anderson	Jack Whitaker	Heywood Hale Broun	Heywood Hale Broun and Pia Lindström	Jack Whitaker
1970	CBS	Chic Anderson	Jack Whitaker	Heywood Hale Broun and Eddie Arcaro	Heywood Hale Broun	Jack Whitaker

=== 1960s ===
Year	Network	Race caller	Hosts	Analysts	Reporters	Trophy presentation
1969	CBS	Chic Anderson	Jack Whitaker	Heywood Hale Broun and Eddie Arcaro		Jack Whitaker
1968	CBS	Jack Drees	Jack Drees and Jack Whitaker			Jack Whitaker
1967	CBS	Jack Drees	Jack Drees and Jack Whitaker			Jack Whitaker
1966	CBS	Jack Drees	Jack Whitaker	Bryan Field		Jack Whitaker
1965	CBS	Bryan Field	Jack Drees and Jack Whitaker		Gil Stratton	Jack Whitaker
1964	CBS	Bryan Field	Jack Drees and Chris Schenkel			Jack Whitaker
1963	CBS	Bryan Field	Jack Drees and Chris Schenkel	Eddie Arcaro		Jack Drees
1962	CBS	Bryan Field	Chris Schenkel	Don Ameche	Gil Stratton	Chris Schenkel
1961	CBS	Bryan Field	Chris Schenkel			Chris Schenkel
1960	CBS	Fred Capossela	Chris Schenkel, Bryan Field, and Bud Palmer			Chris Schenkel

=== 1950s ===
Year	Network	Race caller	Color commentator	Reporters	Trophy Presentation
1959	CBS	Fred Capossela	Bryan Field and Chris Schenkel		Chris Schenkel
1958	CBS	Fred Capossela	Bryan Field		
1957	CBS	Fred Capossela	Bryan Field		
1956	CBS	Fred Capossela	Bryan Field		
1955	CBS	Fred Capossela	Phil Sutterfield and Win Elliot		
1954	CBS	Bryan Field	Mel Allen		Bill Corum
1953	CBS	Bryan Field	Mel Allen	Phil Sutterfield	Phil Sutterfield
1952	CBS	Bryan Field	Sam Renick	Pete French	
