= Thoroughbred Racing on CBS =

- The logo from the 1985 Belmont Stakes
- Genre: Horse racing telecasts
- Country of origin: United States
- Original language: English

Production
- Camera setup: Multi-camera
- Running time: 120 minutes or until race ends
- Production company: CBS Sports

Original release
- Network: CBS
- Release: June 12, 1948 – June 8, 1985

Thoroughbred Racing on CBS is the de facto title for a series of horse races events whose broadcasts are produced by CBS Sports, the sports division of the CBS television network in the United States.

== History ==
CBS first televised horse racing in 1948 with their broadcast of the Belmont Stakes. CBS would broadcast the Belmont Stakes the following year before losing the rights to NBC for the next three years. CBS would resume broadcasting the Belmont Stakes in 1953 and continue to televise it through 1985.

A year after their inaugural telecast of the Belmont Stakes, CBS broadcast the Preakness Stakes, which they would continue to do so through 1976. In 1977, ABC was awarded the contract to televise the Preakness.

Finally, CBS broadcast the Kentucky Derby from 1952 to 1974. The 1952 Kentucky Derby was the first to be broadcast on network television; Louisville had previously not been connected to network lines.

=== Notable moments ===
- 1973 Preakness Stakes – The time of the race was controversial. When the race ended, the official time for Secretariat was listed on the infield teletimer as 1:55. However, multiple clockers disagreed. The track's electronic timer had malfunctioned because of damage caused by members of the crowd crossing the track to reach the infield. The Pimlico Race Course clocker, E.T. McLean Jr., announced a hand time of 1:54 2/5. However, two veteran Daily Racing Form clockers claimed the time was 1:53 2/5, which would have broken the track record of 1:54 by Cañonero II in 1971. Tapes of Secretariat and Cañonero II were played side by side by CBS, and Secretariat got to the finish line first on tape, though this was not a reliable method of timing a horse race at the time. The Maryland Jockey Club, which managed the Pimlico racetrack and is responsible for maintaining Preakness records, reviewed the tapes of the 1973 race and the 1971 race, which held the record at the time, and found Secretariat had finished ahead of Cañonero II. However, the Jockey Club discarded both the electronic and Daily Racing Form times and recognized 1:54 2/5 as the official time, 2/5 slower than Cañonero's. But Daily Racing Form, for the first time in history, printed its own clocking of 1:53 2/5 next to the official time in the chart of the race. Then, on June 19, 2012, a special meeting of the Maryland Racing Commission was convened at Laurel Park at the request of Penny Chenery, Secretariat's owner, who hired companies to conduct a forensic review of the videotapes of the race, and Thomas Chuckas, the president of the Maryland Jockey Club. After over two hours of testimony, the commission unanimously voted to change the time of Secretariat's win from 1:54 2/5 to 1:53, establishing a new stakes record. The Daily Racing Form then announced that it would honor the commission's ruling with regard to the running time.
- 1973 Belmont Stakes – Secretariat became the ninth Triple Crown winner in history, and the first in 25 years since Citation. CBS Television announcer Chic Anderson described the horse's pace in a famous commentary: "Secretariat is widening now! He is moving like a tremendous machine!"
- 1978 Belmont Stakes – Affirmed over Alydar to become the last horse racing Triple Crown of the 20th century.

=== The end of CBS' involvement ===
In 1985, Triple Crown Productions was created when the owner of Spend a Buck chose not to run in the other two Triple Crown races because of a financial incentive offered to any Kentucky Derby winner who could win a set of competing races in New Jersey. The organizers of the three races realized that they needed to work together. Other than the Kentucky Derby, the Preakness Stakes and Belmont Stakes were considered the two "other" races. ABC Sports, which had broadcast the Derby since 1975, wanted to televise all the races as a three race package. CBS Sports, which showed the other two races, had much lower ratings for them, with the possible exceptions of years in which the Crown was at stake like 1973, 1977, and 1978.

== Commentators ==
=== Race callers ===
- Chic Anderson (1968–1978) – Starting in 1969, Anderson's Derby calls would not only be heard by Churchill patrons but also on the CBS Television Network, where he assumed Jack Drees' role on the network's coverage of all three Triple Crown races, as well as other thoroughbred events. Anderson would eventually gain a level of fame as a national race caller exceeded only by that of Clem McCarthy and Ted Husing. Because of his TV experience and knowledge of horses, CBS adopted him as a full-fledged member of their sportscasting team for big races, providing jockey interviews and insights as well as the race calls.
- Marshall Cassidy (1979–1985) – Cassidy was the most prominent announcer in racing in the early to mid-1980s, not only for his on-track work but also as a sportscaster calling races for WCBS radio, CBS television, ABC television, NBC television and ESPN television. He was best known for his accuracy, precise diction and upbeat delivery, especially early in his career when calling a close race as the horses ran down the stretch.
- Fred Capossela (1954–1960) – From 1950 to 1960, Capossela was the "Voice of the Triple Crown" on CBS Radio and Television.
- Jack Drees (1963–1968) – In 1960, he was hired by CBS to call St. Louis Cardinals football games. In 1967/68 he called Super Bowl I and II for the CBS Radio Network. In addition to NFL games, Drees also called college football, golf, and horse races for CBS.
- Bryan Field (1948–1966) – He is credited as one of the first people to apply the term "Triple Crown" to the Kentucky Derby, Preakness Stakes, and Belmont Stakes. Field announced races for CBS television, CBS radio, and Mutual Broadcasting System. As a broadcaster he was noted for his "Irish-British-New York accent". He also went by the name Thomas Bryan George during his early radio career.

=== Hosts ===
- Mel Allen (1953–1954; 1956) – Shortly after graduating, Allen took a train to New York City for a week's vacation. While on that week's vacation, he auditioned for a staff announcer's position at the CBS Radio Network. CBS executives already knew of Allen; the network's top sportscaster, Ted Husing, had heard many of his Crimson Tide broadcasts. He was hired at $45 a week. He often did non-sports announcing such as for big band remotes, or "emceeing" game shows such as Truth or Consequences, serving as an understudy for both sportscaster Husing and newscaster Bob Trout. In his first year at CBS, he announced the crash of the Hindenburg when the station cut away from singer Kate Smith's show. He first became a national celebrity when he ad libbed for a half-hour during the rain-delayed Vanderbilt Cup from an airplane. In 1939, he was the announcer for the Warner Brothers & Vitaphone film musical short-subject, On the Air, with Leith Stevens and the Saturday Night Swing Club. Stephen Borelli, in his biography How About That?! (a favorite expression of Allen's after an outstanding play by the home team), states that it was at CBS's suggestion in 1937, the year Melvin Israel joined the network, that he go by a different last name on the air. He chose Allen, his father's middle name as well as his own, and legally changed his name to Melvin Allen in 1943.
- Win Elliot (1955) – Elliot broadcast horse racing events in the 1960s and conducted one of the early call-in sports radio talk shows on WCBS-AM in New York.
- Jim Kelly (1982–1984) – Substitute host for Brent Musburger.
- Brent Musburger (1982–1985) – By 1975, at CBS, Musburger went from doing the NFL play-by-play (and other items, mostly on CBS' Sports Saturday/Sunday programs) to rise to prominence as the host of the network's National Football League studio show, The NFL Today. Suddenly, Musburger began to cover many assignments for CBS Sports. Among the other events he covered, either as studio host or play-by-play announcer, were college football and basketball, the National Basketball Association, horse racing, the U.S. Open (tennis) tournament, and The Masters golf tournament. He would even lend his talents to weekend afternoon fare such as The World's Strongest Man contests and the like. Musburger also called Major League Baseball games for CBS Radio.
- Bud Palmer (1960)
- Sam Renick (1952; 1954)
- Chris Schenkel (1958–1964) – In 1956, he moved to CBS Sports, where he continued to call Giants games, along with boxing, Triple Crown horse racing and The Masters golf tournament, among other events.
- Jack Whitaker (1965–1982) – He entered network sports in 1961 at CBS, where he hosted the anthology series CBS Sports Spectacular among other duties. He worked for CBS for more than two decades. Whitaker is probably best remembered for his coverage of golf and horse racing. He covered thoroughbred racing's Triple Crown Events, golf's four major championships, the very first Super Bowl, championship boxing, the National Professional Soccer League in 1967, the North American Soccer League a year later, and Major League Baseball. He was a studio host for The NFL Today at CBS, the network's pre-game show. The Whitaker character, played by Gary McKillips, appears in the June 2007 ESPN Original Entertainment production Ruffian. The film is based upon the storied 1975 match race between unbeaten filly Ruffian and Kentucky Derby-winning colt Foolish Pleasure. Ruffian broke her leg during the race and was later euthanized. The Whitaker character is shown introducing the race in the paddock area of Belmont Park in New York.

=== Analysts ===
- Don Ameche (1962 Kentucky Derby)
- Eddie Arcaro (1963–1970) – After working as a television commentator on racing for CBS and ABC, he was a public relations officer for the Golden Nugget Casino in Las Vegas before retiring to Miami, Florida.
- Heywood Hale Broun (1969–1976) – Nicknamed "Woodie", Broun joined CBS in 1966, where he worked for two decades as a color commentator on a wide variety of sporting events, including the Triple Crown of thoroughbred racing.
- Jimmy Snyder (1977–1985)
- Frank I. Wright (1971–1985) – Wright got his start in broadcasting announcing races locally in New York and Maryland. After Canonero II won the 1971 Kentucky Derby, Wright was hired by CBS as an analyst for its horse racing coverage. The network felt that his ability to speak Spanish would allow him to speak with the horse's owner, trainer and jockey.

=== Reporters ===
- Charlsie Cantey (1977–1985) – From 1977 to 1986, she served as a CBS contributor for NFL, NBA, America's Cup and horse racing coverage.
- Bill Corum (1954) – On radio, Corum called the Kentucky Derby with Clem McCarthy, and the World Series with Red Barber among others.
- Pete French (1952)
- Phyllis George (1975–1984) – CBS Sports producers approached George to become a sportscaster in 1974. The following year, she joined the cast of The NFL Today, co-hosting live pregame shows before National Football League (NFL) games. She was one of the first females to have a nationally prominent role in television sports coverage. Another duty George had with CBS Sports was working on horse racing events, including the Preakness Stakes and the Belmont Stakes.
- Jim Kelly (1982–1984) – Kelly worked for CBS and CBS Radio from 1974 to 1985. His assignments included calling golf for the PGA Tour on CBS and PGA Tour on CBS Radio, football for the NFL on CBS and NFL on CBS Radio, and basketball for the NBA on CBS, as well as golf, track and field, bowling, and horse racing. He hosted the Sports World Roundup on CBS Radio, CBS Sports Saturday and CBS Sports Sunday on CBS Television, served as sports anchor for the CBS Morning News.
- Pia Lindström (1971–1972) – Lindström began her broadcasting career as a reporter at KGO-TV in San Francisco in 1966 and in 1971 went to WCBS-TV in New York City. From 1973 to 1997, she was a news anchorwoman and also a theater and arts critic for WNBC-TV in New York City, and made television appearances and did some acting (in mostly Italian films) before she became a news correspondent.
- John Madden (1983)
- Gil Stratton (1962; 1965) – While working for CBS Sports in both television and radio, he covered the 1960 Summer Olympics from Rome. He also covered the NFL as "the voice" of the Los Angeles Rams in the 1960s, and called Major League Baseball games, Kentucky Derbies, and feature races from Santa Anita, Hollywood Park, and Del Mar. He also covered many other sports, such as hockey, tennis, track and field and golf.
- Phil Sutterfield (1955)

== See also ==
- List of Belmont Stakes broadcasters (1948–1959; 1953–1985)
- List of Kentucky Derby broadcasters (1952–1974)
- List of Preakness Stakes broadcasters (1949–1976)
