= John Battaglia Memorial Stakes =

- Class: Listed
- Location: Turfway Park; Florence, Kentucky
- Inaugurated: 1982
- Race type: Thoroughbred - Flat racing
- Website: Turfway Park

Race information
- Distance: 1 1/16 miles (8 1/2 furlongs)
- Surface: Tapeta
- Track: Left-handed
- Qualification: Three-year-olds
- Weight: Assigned
- Purse: $175k

The John Battaglia Memorial Stakes is a race for thoroughbred horses held in early March at Turfway Park. The race is open to three-year-olds willing to race one and one-sixteenth miles on the Tapeta surface. The race is an ungraded stakes with a current purse of $175,000.

Begun in 1982, the race is a prep to the Jeff Ruby Steaks.

It is currently worth 20 points to the winner for the Kentucky Derby point system. https://www.kentuckyderby.com/races/john-battaglia-memorial/

John Battaglia was the former general manager of the old Latonia Race Track (now Turfway). He also was the general manager of Miles Park (race track) in Louisville, Kentucky. His son, Mike Battaglia, served as the track announcer at Turfway until early 2016 and was also a racing analyst for NBC Sports.

== Winners ==
The following list are the winners of the race.

- 2026 - Great White
- 2025 - California Burrito
- 2024 - Encino
- 2023 - Congruent
- 2022 - Tiz The Bomb
- 2021 - Hush of a Storm
- 2020 - Invador
- 2019 - Somelikeithotbrown
- 2018 - Magicalmeister
- 2017 - It's Your Nickel
- 2016 - Surgical Strike
- 2015 - Royal Son
- 2014 - Solitary Ranger
- 2013 - General Election
- 2012 - State of Play
- 2011 - Positive Response
- 2010 - Vow to Wager
- 2009 - Proceed Bee
- 2008 - Absolutely Cindy (filly)
- 2007 - Catman Running
- 2006 - Laity
- 2005 - Magna Graduate
- 2004 - Silver Minister
- 2003 - Champali
- 2002 - Request For Parole
- 2001 - Bonnie Scot
- 2000 - Nature
- 1999 - K One King
- 1998 - Daniel My Brother
- 1997 - Concerto
- 1996 - Beefchopper
- 1995 - Car Dealer
- 1994 - Mahogany Hall
- 1993 - Fafa Lemos
- 1992 - Quiet Enjoyment
- 1991 - Discover
- 1990 - Private School
- 1989 - Revive
- 1988 - Glory Affair
- 1987 - Lt. Lao (filly)
- 1986 - Blanford Park
- 1985 - Aggie's Best
- 1984 - Magic Ten
- 1983 - Runs Like A Prince
- 1982 - Baraco

The 2021 edition of the race was made a points race on the 2021 Road to the Kentucky Derby. Kentucky Derby winner Rich Strike finished fourth in the 2022 John Battaglia.
