= Frank Mirahmadi =

American horse racing announcer

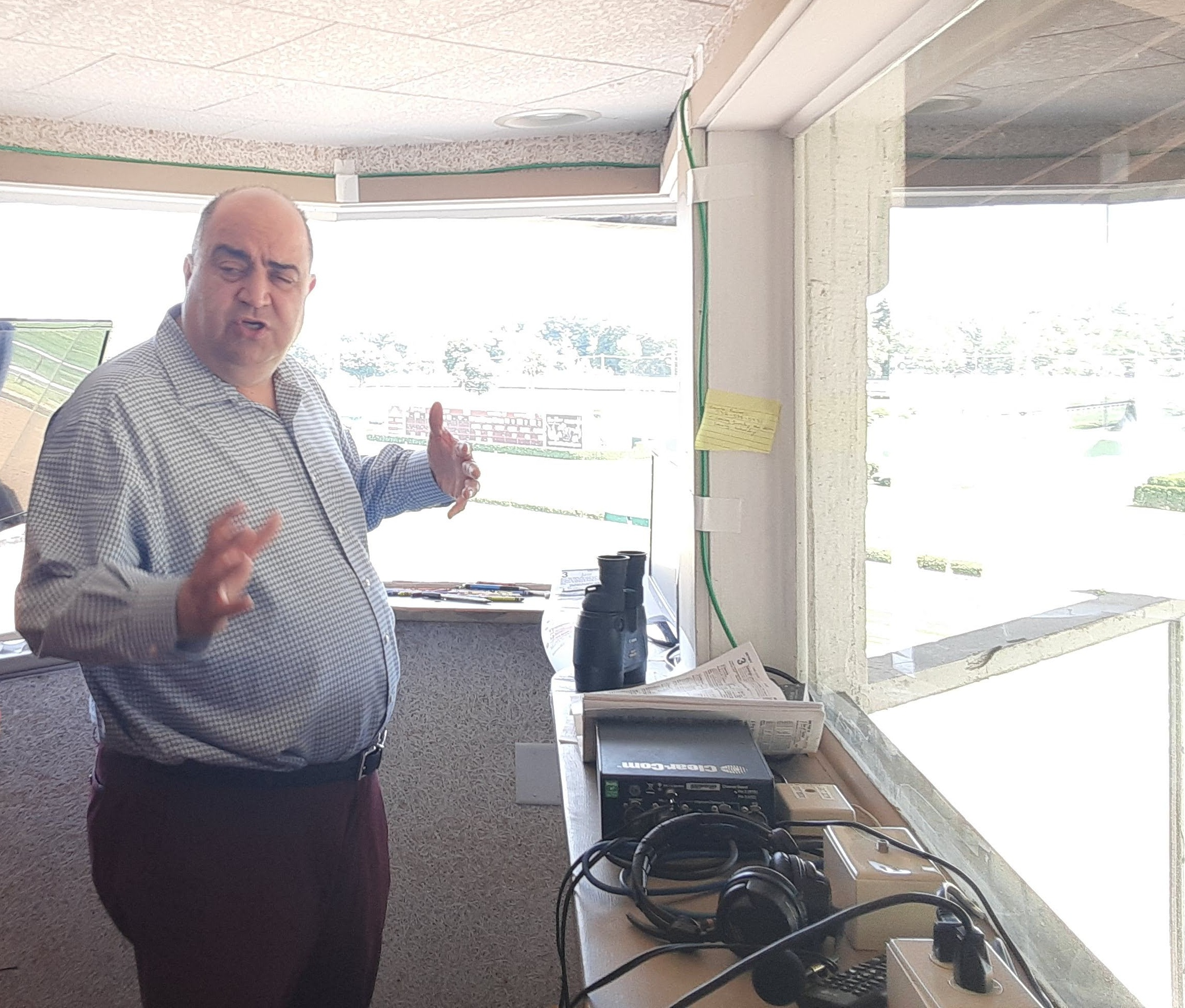
- Born: October 20, 1967 (age 58)
- Sports commentary career
- Sport: Thoroughbred horse racing

Frank Mirahmadi (born 20 October 1967 (age 58)) is a thoroughbred horse racing announcer. He has called at major tracks including Aqueduct, Hialeah, Turf Paradise, Louisiana Downs, Oaklawn Park, Monmouth Park, Golden Gate Fields, Saratoga Race Course and Santa Anita Park.

== Early life ==
Mirahmadi grew up near Santa Anita Park and attended Beverly Hills High School and graduated from The University of Arizona. His father was a big racing fan and took his son to the track at a very young age.

== Career ==
Mirahmadi called his first live race at Hollywood Park on December 24, 1992. In 1996, Mirahmadi got his first full-time announcers job at Hialeah in Florida. He is well known for his imitations of celebrities and other thoroughbred race callers. From a young age, he imitated many announcers, including Dave Johnson, Harry Henson and Trevor Denman. He used 23 voices in a race call at Turf Paradise in 2009.

Mirahmadi has also been a television analyst for the major horse racing network TVG Network and has done handicapping shows for Oaklawn Park, Monmouth Park and NYRA.

Mirahmadi was hired as the new permanent race caller at Santa Anita Park starting with the 2019 winter meet.

In 2022, Mirahmadi was announced as the race caller for the summer season at the Saratoga Race Course in New York. He splits announcing duties between Santa Anita and Saratoga Race Course.

== Personal life ==
Mirahmadi was a contestant on the June 17, 2024 episode of The Price is Right, where he won a trip to Hawaii
