= Barbara Howar =

American author and socialite (1934–2024)

Barbara Stephanye Howar (née Dearing; September 27, 1934 – August 2, 2024) was an American author and socialite. She was the older sister of Charlsie Cantey.

Howar was born Barbara Stephanye Dearing in Nashville, Tennessee on 27 September 1934 and grew up in Raleigh, North Carolina. She was the second of three daughters of engineering-industry sales manager Charles Oscar Dearing and his wife Mary Elizabeth (née O’Connell) who was also known as Buffy. She was a graduate of the Holton-Arms School and St. Mary's Junior College. She was married to Edmond N. Howar from 1958 to their divorce in 1967. She was featured in an article in the July 29, 1966 issue of LIFE.

She wrote the 1973 memoir Laughing All the Way and the 1976 novel Making Ends Meet. Charlotte Curtis of The New York Times described the former as "delightful, gossipy, occasionally hilarious memoirs" of which the message was "how she managed to survive her own antics and enough personal recognition to choke a goat." Writing for the same publication, Erica Jong compared Making Ends Meet with Howar's previous literary work as "equally well‐written but somehow less immediate and convincing" and that it "seems to lack narrative drive and a sense of purpose." R.Z. Sheppard of TIME opined, "As a novelist, Howar seems to have learned a lot from old movies and talk shows. Her basic technique is the flashback and her keenest instinct is for the spiky remark."

She died at her home in Los Angeles, California, at the age of 89.
