= Marshall Cassidy =

American horse race announcer (1945–2021)

Marshall Cassidy (July 10, 1945 – February 7, 2021) was an American Thoroughbred racing official based in New York State, and a former public address announcer and sportscaster. Cassidy had also served as a patrol and placing judge for the New York Racing Association, and as an alternate steward.

Cassidy was best known for the 18 years he spent as one of the race callers for NYRA, at Aqueduct Racetrack, Belmont Park and Saratoga Race Course. He worked as backup track announcer to Dave Johnson and Chic Anderson. Cassidy became lead announcer after the death of Anderson in March 1979.

Cassidy was the most prominent announcer in racing in the early to mid-1980s, not only for his on-track work but also as a sportscaster calling races for WCBS radio, CBS television, ABC television, NBC television and ESPN television. He was best known for his accuracy, precise diction and upbeat delivery, especially early in his career when calling a close race as the horses ran down the stretch.

Cassidy remained the lead race caller for NYRA until 1990, when he was replaced by track announcer Tom Durkin. Cassidy called the fourth race at Saratoga Race Course on September 1, 2008.

Cassidy died at his home in Saratoga Springs on February 7, 2021, at age 75.

== Personal ==
Cassidy was part of a well-known family of racing officials. His maternal grandfather, Marshall Whiting Cassidy, was a race starter and later steward who eventually became racing director for NYRA's predecessor agencies, and later executive director of The Jockey Club. His maternal great-grandfather, Marshall (Mars) Cassidy, was also a fixture in New York racing as a race starter and the first to use a barrier to start a race. George Cassidy, his grand-uncle, was a race starter for some five decades (mostly at the NYRA tracks) until he retired late December 1980.
