= Chic Anderson =

American sportscaster and public address announcer

Personal information
- Born: December 17, 1931 Evansville, Indiana
- Died: March 24, 1979 (aged 47) Commack, New York
- Occupation: Thoroughbred horse race caller
- Spouse: Marsha (Kroener) Anderson
- Children: 5

Horse racing career
- Sport: Horse racing

Charles David "Chic" Anderson (December 17, 1931 – March 24, 1979) was an American sportscaster and public address announcer specializing in Thoroughbred horse racing. He was one of American sports' most famous PA voices, and remains among its most revered race callers. Anderson's narration of the 1973 Belmont Stakes, where he described Secretariat as "moving like a tremendous machine", remains one of horse racing's most memorable calls.

== Racing background ==
A native of Evansville, Indiana, Anderson got his start in horse racing in 1951, working part-time in the mutuel department at Dade Park (now Ellis Park Racecourse) in nearby Henderson, Kentucky. Eight years later, in 1959, Anderson became track announcer.

The following year, in 1960, Anderson also became the public-address voice of Churchill Downs, home of the Kentucky Derby. He would call 16 Runs for the Roses between then and 1977. During that stretch, Anderson also worked as a Midwest sports anchor, gaining the TV experience that would serve him well nationally in the 1970s.

In addition to Ellis and Churchill, Anderson worked at Oaklawn Park, Santa Anita Park, Ak-Sar-Ben and Arlington Park racetracks in the 1960s and 1970s.

Starting in 1969, Anderson's Derby calls would not only be heard by Churchill patrons but also on the CBS Television Network, where he assumed Jack Drees' role on the network's coverage of all three Triple Crown races, as well as other thoroughbred events. Anderson would eventually gain a level of fame as a national race caller exceeded only by that of Clem McCarthy and Ted Husing.

Because of his TV experience and knowledge of horses, CBS adopted him as a full-fledged member of their sportscasting team for big races, providing jockey interviews and insights as well as the race calls.

Anderson would remain at Churchill Downs until May 1977. After calling Seattle Slew's victory in the Derby for both Churchill and ABC Television, he moved his base of operations to the New York Racing Association (NYRA) tracks, including Belmont Park, succeeding NYRA race caller Dave Johnson. That allowed him to call Slew's victory in the 1977 Belmont Stakes for the racetrack, which likely makes Anderson the only man to call two Triple Crown races on the tracks' public-address systems in one year.

During his NYRA tenure, Anderson's daily calls would not only be heard by fans at the track, but also on WCBS radio.

In November 1978, Anderson called Seattle Slew's last race, the Stuyvesant Handicap at Aqueduct Racetrack, live for CBS Television, WCBS radio, and fans at the track. As Slew, ridden by Ángel Cordero Jr., roared down the stretch far enough in front to ensure a win, Anderson emoted. "Ladies and gentlemen, here he is, the champion of the world, Seattle Slew!"

== Notable race calls ==
For CBS Television, Anderson authored the two most famous calls in horse-racing history—and two of the most famous sportscasts in TV history—the Triple Crown clinchings in the Belmont Stakes of 1973 and 1978.

=== "A tremendous machine!" ===
Anderson was behind the CBS microphone for the 1973 Belmont Stakes, when Kentucky Derby and Preakness Stakes winner Secretariat tried to become the first horse in a quarter-century to win the Triple Crown. A stunned Anderson punctuated Secretariat's powerful move on the final turn of the race this way, focusing on Secretariat while still keeping tabs on the other horses' positions:

They're on the turn, and Secretariat is blazing along! The first three-quarters of a mile in 1:09 and four-fifths. Secretariat is widening now! He is moving like a tremendous machine! Secretariat by twelve! Secretariat by fourteen lengths on the turn! Sham is dropping back. It looks like they'll catch him today, as My Gallant and Twice a Prince are both coming up to him now. But Secretariat is all alone! He's out there almost a sixteenth of a mile away from the rest of the horses! Secretariat is in a position that seems impossible to catch. He's into the stretch. Secretariat leads this field by 18 lengths, and now Twice a Prince has taken second and My Gallant has moved back to third. They're in the stretch! Secretariat has opened a 22-length lead! He is going to be the Triple Crown winner! Here comes Secretariat to the wire. An unbelievable, an amazing performance! He hits the finish 25 lengths in front! It's going to be Twice a Prince second, My Gallant third, Private Smiles fourth, and Sham, who had it today, dropped back to fifth.

A few minutes later, reviewing the videotape of Secretariat's stretch romp, Anderson humbly admitted it was hard to count lengths as Secretariat raced toward home. "I said twenty-five," Anderson recalled. "It could conceivably have been more."

In fact, Secretariat's winning margin was a full 31 lengths— a distance it took careful examination of videotape and trackside photographs to measure. Secretariat was so far ahead when he crossed the finish line that the TV camera operator had to pan to the left to pick up the rest of the field, lest he leave an "empty" finish line in the viewer's line of sight for a full five seconds.

=== "We'll test these two to the wire!" ===
Five years later, for both CBS Sports and the Belmont Park fans, Anderson called a 1978 Belmont Stakes race that was as close as the 1973 Belmont was a romp.

Affirmed and Alydar—who battled each other closely both as two-year-old horses and in the 1978 Triple Crown races (with Affirmed prevailing barely in both the Kentucky Derby and Preakness Stakes)—renewed their battle in that year's Belmont. They hooked up in earnest a half-mile into the race and held a virtual match race for the rest of the event.

It is still Affirmed as they come to the quarter pole. He's holding on to a head lead. Alydar is outside of him and challenging that lead. The two are heads apart and Alydar's got a lead! Alydar put a head in front right in the middle of the stretch! It's Alydar and Affirmed battling back along the inside! We'll test these two to the wire! Affirmed under a left-hand whip! Alydar on the outside driving! Affirmed and Alydar heads apart. Affirmed's got a nose in front as they come on the wire!

Then, shutting off the PA microphone (as track announcers did then) but keeping his CBS microphone hot, he described the final moment of victory:

At the finish, it's going to be dead tight—Affirmed won it! He wins the Triple Crown. Alydar is second! Steve Cauthen salutes the crowd. Darby Creek Road in third, Judge Advocate fourth, and Noon Time Spender finished fifth—and what a stirring stretch battle! They both had their shot at this one during the stretch run!

=== 1975 Kentucky Derby ===
Anderson's only prominent mistake came in the 1975 Kentucky Derby, which he called for both the Churchill Downs fans and ABC Television. Confused by the similar silks of favorite Foolish Pleasure and Prince Thou Art, he described Prince Thou Art as the leader during the late stages of the race, before correcting himself near the end. A newspaper headline on Anderson's rare error read "Prince Thou Ain't". History-minded observers compared it to a similar mistake that announcer Clem McCarthy had made during the running of the 1947 Preakness Stakes.

== Voice of racing ==
Anderson's style as a public-address announcer—even when the PA call was also carried on TV—was low-key, almost robotic, at the start of a race. (On arena PA systems, rapid-fire calls often end up a blur to the ears of fans scattered throughout a track or stadium). Anderson would then pick up a vibrant pace halfway through the race.

Anderson used a more animated style at the start when his call aired only on TV, maintaining a brisk pace while remaining measured, avoiding the clichés and the screaming style other track announcers adopted in the 1980s and beyond.

== Personal life ==
Anderson attended Wabash College for two years, served two years in the United States Navy then received a degree from Indiana University. He and his wife, Marsha, had five children. Anderson died of a heart attack at age 47 on March 24, 1979, at his home in Commack, New York on Long Island. He was succeeded at both NYRA and CBS by his backup, Marshall Cassidy.
