= Charlsie Cantey =

American sportscaster

Charlsie Cantey (née Dearing; born c. 1946 in Raleigh, North Carolina), one of broadcasting's veteran thoroughbred horse racing analysts, is an American sportscaster who worked for ESPN (1985–2002), ABC Sports (1986–2000), WOR-TV (1975–1977), CBS Sports (1977–1986), USA Network (2002–2005) and NBC Sports (2000–2005).

== Career ==
=== Early career ===
Cantey studied for two years at Mount Vernon College for Women then two years at George Washington University, graduating in 1968 despite missing class a number of times to ride horses. She was an exercise rider for Ruffian when Frank Whiteley first started training the filly in late 1973 in Camden, South Carolina, and she later became a horse trainer.

Cantey appeared on TV on What's My Line? as the trainer of a thoroughbred named Arlene Francis, which was named after one of the show's stars; the real Arlene Francis failed to guess her occupation.

When Cantey was an exercise rider at Belmont Park in 1975, WOR-TV chose her to co-host that station's weekly racing programs with Frank Wright and Dave Johnson. WOR, which at the time aired the most sports coverage of any station in the country with 1,000 hours per year, broadcast three thoroughbred racing programs -- Racing from Belmont, Racing from Aqueduct and Racing from Saratoga—reaching 300,000 viewers each week. New York Racing Association executive director for TV and film Bill Creasy wanted to add a woman to the program, but more importantly, someone who could explain horse racing to the audience. Cantey was recommended by Frank Tours, who had played a major role in racing shows for KNXT in Los Angeles for 13 years. She owned the gelding Too Many Chiefs, the oldest horse active on New York tracks.

=== CBS Sports and ESPN ===
From 1977 to 1986, she served as a CBS contributor for NFL, NBA, America's Cup and horse racing coverage. She also served as a panel member on CBS' The NFL Today in 1984 replacing Phyllis George, who went on maternity Leave.

From 1985 to 2002, Cantey was a reporter and analyst for Racing Across America for ESPN.

=== ABC Sports, USA Network and NBC Sports ===
Cantey joined ABC Sports in April 1986. In addition to her coverage of the Triple Crown, she served as an expert analyst and reporter for ABC's Wide World of Sports' live coverage of major Kentucky Derby prep races from 1986 through 2001.

In November 2000, Cantey joined NBC Sports as its expert analyst during the network's coverage of the 2000 Breeders' Cup. She worked for NBC for 5 years (2000–2005).

From 2002 to 2005, Cantey became a reporter for USA Network coverage of the Westminster Kennel Club. At that time, Cantey had covered Triple Crown races for 17 consecutive years, moving from CBS to ABC Sports and then NBC Sports. Also for NBC, she covered Breeders' Cup races. Cantey continued to train horses.

Cantey decided to retire from television after the 2005 Breeders' Cup. She was one of several investors from NBC who owned the filly Conflict of Interest.

== Family ==
Cantey is the younger sister of Barbara Howar. Charlsie's father Charles Oscar Dearing wanted to name his son after himself, but she turned out to be a girl.

Her first husband was trainer Joseph B. Cantey whom she married in 1969 in Camden, South Carolina. By 1976, Charlsie was 30, and her husband had been a trainer for five years. They have one son, J.B. Cantey, a pediatrician.

Cantey is married to Douglas Davidson and lives in Okatie, South Carolina.
