= Tom Durkin (sportscaster) =

American sportscaster

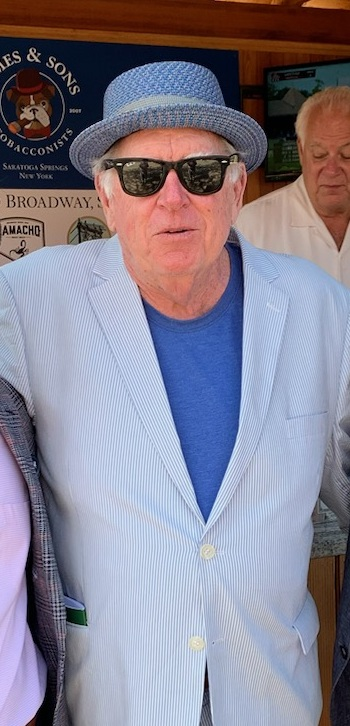
- Born: November 30, 1950 (age 75); Chicago, Illinois
- Sports commentary career
- Sport: Thoroughbred horse racing

Tom Durkin (born November 30, 1950) is a semi-retired American sportscaster and public address announcer specializing in Thoroughbred horse racing. He was the race caller for NBC Sports from 1984 through 2010 and served as announcer for the New York Racing Association from 1990 until retiring in 2014. For his career-long dedication, he was awarded the Eclipse Award of Merit in January 2015.

== Life and career ==
Durkin was born in Chicago, Illinois. He studied drama at St. Norbert College in De Pere, Wisconsin. In 1971, he was hired as a race caller at Quarter Horse and Thoroughbred races at county fairs in Wisconsin. He did this each summer through 1975 then the following year was employed by the Daily Racing Form as a call taker responsible for documenting the comments and statistics used in the official charts of the races at Cahokia Downs and Thistledown Racecourse. He went on to work as a race caller at Florida Downs in Oldsmar, Florida, Miles Park in Louisville, Kentucky, Quad City Downs in East Moline, Illinois, Balmoral Park Racetrack in Crete, Illinois, Hialeah Park Race Track in Hialeah, Florida, Meadowlands Racetrack in East Rutherford, New Jersey and Gulfstream Park in Hallandale Beach, Florida.

At The Meadowlands, Durkin called the match race in 1989 Hambletonian Stakes harness race between Park Avenue Joe and Probe: the horses finished in a dead heat, becoming the only co-winners of the prestigious race.

=== NYRA ===
In 1990, Durkin was hired to call races at the New York Racing Association's Aqueduct Racetrack Belmont Park and Saratoga Race Course. Like his predecessor at NYRA, Marshall Cassidy, Durkin also served as TV voice on important stakes races on ESPN beyond the Triple Crown and Breeders' Cup series.

On May 10, 2014, Durkin announced that he would retire from his announcer position on August 31 near end of the 2014 Saratoga meet. He owed his "inexpressible gratitude" to the racing fans and horseplayers in a retirement speech following his final race call.

=== NBC ===
Durkin served as the Breeders Cup's chief TV voice from its inception through 2005 and was a longtime broadcaster on NBC as part of the network's sportscasting crew for horse races, providing analysis, commentary and features in addition to the descriptions of races.

Durkin earned fame in this decade from calling the U.S. Triple Crown races for NBC, which took over coverage of the events in 2001. Due to his contract with NBC, Durkin no longer called Breeders' Cup races, starting from 2006 as those races moved to ESPN. However, he continued calling the Belmont Stakes, which aired on ABC because of his position as the track announcer at Belmont Park.

On April 26, 2011, Durkin announced his decision not to renew his contract with NBC Sports, citing anxiety and stress. “It’s just the stress got to be too much,” he told Daily Racing Form.

=== Post-retirement race calls ===
In 2023, Durkin came out of retirement to call the 2023 Belmont Stakes for FOX as part of the network's coverage for its debut of the race.

He called the second race on closing day at Aqueduct Racetrack on June 28, 2026.

=== In popular culture ===
In 1980, Durkin appeared as a contestant on the game show Match Game PM and won $1,000.
