= Miles Park =

Former American horse racing track

Miles Park was an American horse racing track located in Louisville, Jefferson County, Kentucky. The track served as the "minor leagues" for many jockeys who later went on to the larger, more famous Kentucky tracks. The biggest event was the annual Junior Derby.

Miles Park started life as Fairgrounds Speedway, a harness racing track in 1956, but was converted to thoroughbred racing and renamed Miles Park two years later, after being acquired by oilman and horseman General J. Fred Miles. The track struggled after a fire in May 1964 killed 26 thoroughbreds and burned down 13 barns.

The track was renamed Commonwealth Race Course after being sold in 1974 and ran American Quarter Horse meets for two years before burning in 1978 and closing permanently.
