= Lesley Visser =

American sportscaster and sportswriter (born 1953)

- Born: Lesley Candace Visser; September 11, 1953 (age 73); Quincy, Massachusetts, U.S.
- Occupations: Sportscaster, Radio-TV Personality, Sportswriter
- Sports commentary career
- Teams: The NFL Today, Major League Baseball on CBS, NBA on CBS, Major League Baseball on ABC, CBS Sports
- Sports: NFL, NCAA men's basketball, NBA, MLB, Figure skating, Tennis, Horse racing
- Website: LesleyVisser.com

Lesley Candace Visser (born September 11, 1953) is an American sportscaster, television and radio personality, and sportswriter. Visser is the first female NFL analyst on TV, and the only sportscaster in history who has worked on Final Four, NBA Finals, World Series, Triple Crown, Monday Night Football, the Olympics, the Super Bowl, the World Figure Skating Championships and the U.S. Open network broadcasts. Visser, who was voted the No. 1 Female Sportscaster of all time in a poll taken by the American Sportscasters Association, was inducted into the National Sportscasters and Sportswriters Association's Hall of Fame in 2015 and the International Sports Hall of Fame in 2020.

In 2009, Visser became the first woman to be an analyst for an NFL game on TV. She is currently a reporter for CBS Sports and News, writes for CBSSports.com and is also part of WFTL 640 Fox Sports' morning drive in South Florida, as well as one of the hosts of a CBS Sports Network weekly television show, We Need to Talk.

Visser was the first woman to be recognized by the Pro Football Hall of Fame as the 2006 recipient of the Pete Rozelle Radio-Television Award which recognizes long-time exceptional contributions to radio and television in professional football. Pro Football Hall of Famer Troy Aikman said about Visser in his 2006 induction speech, "[She] brought respect and professionalism to the field of journalism for her work in print and broadcasting. It makes me proud to be in [her] company today."

A pioneer among women sports journalists, Visser re-joined CBS Sports in August 2000 after a six-year hiatus. She was formerly the sideline reporter for Monday Night Football among other assignments she had at ESPN and ABC Sports, such as the World Series, the Triple Crown and the World Figure Skating Championship. She serves as correspondent for the network's NFL and college basketball programming.

== Early life ==
Born on September 11, 1953, in Quincy, Massachusetts, to a school teacher and engineer, Visser loved sports from an early age. On Halloween, when other little girls would dress up as Mary Poppins, she would go as former Boston Celtics guard Sam Jones. From the age of 10 she wanted to be a sportswriter, but there was one problem—the job didn't exist for women. Her family didn't discourage her. “My parents didn’t say girls can’t do that, and my mother told me, ‘Sometimes you have to cross when it says “don’t walk.”’” After graduating from South Hadley High School, Visser was educated at Boston College, majoring in English.

While at Boston College, Visser wrote for The Heights, the university's student newspaper, beginning what would become a five-decade career in sports journalism. Contributing to the paper's sports coverage, she wrote a September 1974 article on the school's field hockey team, describing the players as "just as dedicated as any team on this campus." Reflecting on the experience years later, Visser said her "entire career began in the cramped newsroom of the Heights," recalling that professional sportswriting jobs were largely closed to women at the time and that the student paper gave her an early opportunity to work in the field.

== Career ==
=== The Boston Globe ===
In 1974, Visser won a prestigious Carnegie Foundation grant which entitled her to work as a sportswriter at The Boston Globe. In 14 years at the Globe, she covered college basketball, the NBA, Major League Baseball, tennis, college football, golf and horse racing. In 1976, she was assigned to cover the New England Patriots, becoming the first ever female NFL beat writer. In 2009, Sports Illustrated named The Boston Globe sports sections (1975–1980) the best sports section of all time.

In January 1981, Visser made national news with her story regarding the 1978-79 Boston College basketball point shaving scandal after gamblers and members of the New York Mafia erroneously told her Boston College Eagle basketball player Michael Bowie was involved. The Globe subsequently reached a settlement with Bowie which included a confidentially clause. ESPN producer Joe Levine later convinced Bowie to break his silence and speak to the network.

=== Begins television career at CBS Sports ===
In 1983, she did a few features for CBS. In 1984, Visser joined CBS Sports part-time and went full-time in 1987. Her assignments included the NBA including the NBA Finals, college basketball including the Final Four, MLB including the World Series, College World Series, college football, horse racing, Tennis including the U.S. Open of Tennis (1984–1993) and the Olympics.

In 1989, she covered the fall of the Berlin Wall, focusing on how sports would change in East Germany. In 1990, she became a regular on The NFL Today with Greg Gumbel, Terry Bradshaw and Pat O'Brien. Also in 1990, Visser became the first woman to cover the World Series. In 1992, she became the first female sportscaster to preside over the Super Bowl Trophy presentation, and the only one to do so until Maria Taylor did it for Super Bowl LX in 2026 with NBC Sports.

=== ABC Sports and ESPN ===
After CBS lost television rights to NFL games in 1993, Visser went to ABC Sports and ESPN. In 1995, she became the first woman ever to report from the sidelines during a Super Bowl when she covered Super Bowl XXIX for ABC. In 1998, she became the first woman ever assigned to Monday Night Football. She also covered Super Bowl XXXIV for ABC in 2000.

While at ABC Sports, Visser served as a reporter for college football bowl games and the NFL playoffs games during Wild Card Saturday. She also contributed to horse racing including the Triple Crown, ABC's Wide World of Sports, Major League Baseball, including the 1995 All-Star Game and World Series, figure skating, Special Olympics, skiing, the Pro Bowl, and an ABC series A Passion to Play. She co-hosted the network's coverage of the "Millennium Tournament of Roses Parade."

For ESPN, Visser covered the Super Bowl, college basketball, figure skating, and horse racing including the Triple Crown. She also contributed to SportsCenter, NFL GameDay, and Monday Night Countdown.

=== Return to CBS Sports ===
In August 2000, Visser returned to CBS, with her assignments being NFL, college basketball, Tennis, Figure skating and Horse racing as well as special projects for CBS News. Today Visser's assignments are a contributor to The NFL Today and college basketball. In 2004, she became the first woman sportscaster to carry the Olympic Torch when she was honored in 2004 by the International Olympic Committee as a "pioneer and standard-bearer."

During the 2001 NFL season Visser became the first female color analyst (NBC's Gayle Sierens was the first female play-by-play announcer) on an NFL broadcast booth. She joined play-by-play announcer Howard David and analyst Boomer Esiason in the booth for Westwood One/CBS Radio. Visser also joined HBO's highly acclaimed Real Sports with Bryant Gumbel.

Visser was a pre-game reporter for The Super Bowl Today, where she covered Super Bowl XXXV, Super Bowl XXXVIII, Super Bowl XLI, and Super Bowl XLIV pre-game broadcasts, and during Super Bowl XLI she also served as a sideline reporter, becoming the first woman ever to do so. Visser was loaned to NBC Sports twice to cover the Olympics as she covered the 2004 Summer Olympics in Athens when she served as the Equestrian reporter. She also covered the 2006 Winter Olympics in Torino as a reporter for Short Track Speed Skating.

In September 2007, she returned to her roots as she now writes a column for CBSSports.com.

== Personal life ==
Visser was married from 1983 to 2010 to sportscaster Dick Stockton, who broadcast football and baseball for Fox and baseball and the NBA for Turner Sports before his retirement in 2021. Visser and Stockton met at the sixth game of the 1975 World Series, where Stockton called Carlton Fisk's iconic home run for NBC and Visser was covering the game for The Boston Globe. Since July 2011, she has been married to businessman and former Harvard basketball captain Bob Kanuth.

In June 1993, Visser suffered a jogging accident in New York's Central Park, breaking her hip and skidding head-first across the pavement, requiring surgery on her face and hip. In 2006, she required an artificial hip replacement.

== Achievements ==
=== Events ===
Visser has covered a number of events:

- 34 Final Fours
- 12 NBA Finals
- 7 World Series
- 15 Kentucky Derbys
- 7 Preakness Stakes
- 10 Belmont Stakes
- 3 Summer Olympics
- 3 Winter Olympics
- 28 Super Bowls
- 7 World Figure Skating Championships
- 29 US Open (tennis)
- 15 Wimbledons

=== Honors ===
In June 2006, Visser was named the first female recipient of the Pete Rozelle Radio-Television Award by the Pro Football Hall of Fame. That same month, she was honored by the American Women in Radio and Television as the first woman sportscaster recipient of a Gracie Allen Award that celebrates programming created for women, by women and about women, as well as individuals who have made exemplary contributions to the industry; in 2007, she became the first woman sportscaster to host the Gracie Awards. Also in 2007, Visser received the Emily Couric Leadership Award—previously given to Sandra Day O'Connor, Caroline Kennedy and Donna Brazile—and in 2007, she was honored at the 22nd Annual Sports Legend Dinner, along with Magic Johnson, Gary Player and John Elway to benefit the Buoniconti fund to cure paralysis. In 2005 she won the Pop Warner female achievement award and was inducted into the New England Sports Museum Hall of Fame, along with Boston Celtics legend Bob Cousy and the 1980 United States Olympic Hockey team.

Visser was honored with the Compass Award for 'changing the paradigm of her business' and was one of 100 luminaries commemorating the 75th anniversary of the CBS Television Network in 2003. She was also named "WISE Woman of the Year" in 2002 and voted the "Outstanding Women's Sportswriter in America" in 1983 and won the "Women's Sports Foundation Award for Journalism" in 1992, and in 1999 she won the first AWSM Pioneer Award. Visser received an honorary doctorate of journalism from her alma mater in May 2007.

Visser became the first woman sportscaster to carry the Olympic Torch when she was honored in 2004 by the International Olympic Committee as a "pioneer and standard-bearer." Visser worked her 34th Final Four/NCAA men's basketball championship in April 2012, having worked the tournament for the Boston Globe, ESPN, and CBS Sports.

In 2005, Visser was elected to the Museum of Television and Radio. Sean McManus, President of CBS News and CBS Sports, summed up her contributions this way: "Lesley Visser's career has broken many barriers and defined previously unimagined roles for women in professional sports and sports broadcasting."

On June 8, 2015, Visser was inducted in the NSSA Hall of Fame, along with Bill Raftery, Hal McCoy and the late Dick Schaap. She is the third woman to be accorded this honor since the National Sportscasters and Sportswriters Association began presenting it in 1962.

In February 2020, ESPN reported that Visser would receive the Sports Emmys Lifetime Achievement Award, the first woman to be so honored.
