= Thoroughbred Racing on NBC =

- Genre: Horse racing telecasts
- Country of origin: United States
- Original language: English

Production
- Camera setup: Multi-camera
- Running time: 120 minutes or until race ends
- Production company: NBC Sports

Original release
- Network: NBC
- Release: 1949 – present

Thoroughbred Racing on NBC is the de facto title for a series of horse races events whose broadcasts are produced by NBC Sports, the sports division of the NBC television network in the United States. NBC's relationship with the Triple Crown of Thoroughbred Racing dates back to 1949 when the NBC Red Network carried the first radio broadcast of the Kentucky Derby.

As of 2023, race coverage is helmed by, among others, host Mike Tirico, along with analysts Randy Moss and Jerry Bailey, handicappers Eddie Olczyk and Britney Eurton, reporters Kenny Rice, Donna Barton Brothers, Ahmed Fareed and Nick Luck and track announcer Larry Collmus.

== History ==
=== Kentucky Derby ===
NBC's relationship with the races that comprise the Triple Crown thoroughbred racing series began in 1949, when the NBC Red Network carried the first radio broadcast of the Kentucky Derby. One week after ESPN signed the Breeders' Cup deal, NBC struck a five-year broadcasting deals with Churchill Downs and Magna Entertainment Corporation, the backers of the Kentucky Derby and Preakness Stakes; NBC renewed its agreement with Churchill Downs in 2010, in a five-year deal through 2015. In 2024, NBC extended their partnership with Churchill Downs through 2032.

=== Breeders' Cup ===
NBC gained the broadcast rights to the Breeders' Cup from its inception in 1984. The network ran the race until 2005, when ESPN signed an eight-year television contract to broadcast the race starting in 2006. In 2012, NBC regained the broadcast rights for the Breeders' Cup. Most races are shown on the NBC Sports Network, while the Classic is broadcast on the main network. NBC subsequently announced plans to also broadcast select races from the Breeders' Cup Challenge series throughout the year. In 2016, nine telecasts were made covering 16 "Win and You're In" races.

=== The Triple Crown ===
In October 1999, NBC Sports won the rights to broadcast the three races in the Triple Crown series (the Kentucky Derby, Preakness Stakes and Belmont Stakes) beginning with the 2001 races.

==== NBC loses the Belmont Stakes ====
On October 4, 2004, citing a dispute about profits accrued from the deal, the New York Racing Association agreed to move the broadcast rights to the Belmont Stakes to ABC/ESPN starting with the 2006 race. NBC retained rights to the Kentucky Derby and Preakness Stakes. Some believe the move was a result of the New York Racing Association's decision to break ranks with the other two tracks on a television contract. NBC Sports continued to broadcast the Kentucky Derby and Preakness Stakes rights until 2010. Triple Crown Productions was formed in 1986 with ABC; prior to that, the individual racing associations reached their own deals with television networks.

Prior to the change, on May 21, 2005, Visa, Inc. officially withdrew its sponsorship of the Triple Crown, effective with the 2006 races; this relieved the company from paying the US$5,000,000 bonus to the owner of the horse that wins the Triple Crown. Sponsorship of the races was taken over by Triple Crown Productions in 2006.

==== NBC reassembles The Triple Crown ====
On February 22, 2011, NBC announced deals to broadcast the Kentucky Derby, Preakness Stakes and Belmont Stakes through 2015. The deals reunited all three Triple Crown races on NBC for the first time since 2005, and also included cable deals with Versus (later NBCSN) to provide coverage of the races' Saturday undercards as well as the Kentucky Oaks and Black-Eyed Susan Stakes Friday races. The deals were extended again, this time through 2022.

==== NBC loses the Belmont Stakes again ====
On January 5, 2022, it was announced that Fox Sports would acquire the media rights to the Belmont Stakes starting in 2023, in a deal that lasts until 2030.

==== Thoroughbred Championship Series and Preakness Stakes move ====
On August 3, 2026, Churchill Downs Incorporated and the New York Racing Association (NYRA) announced the formation of the Thoroughbred Championship Series (TCS), a six-race series that would begin the following year and include the Kentucky Derby and Belmont Stakes, but not the Preakness. As part of the formation of the series, NBC gained the rights to broadcast the two non-Derby races for the series held at Churchill Downs, those being the Matt Winn Stakes and the series championship race. On August 5, NBC signed a six-year deal to keep the Preakness Stakes until 2032, which included the race moving eight days back to the fourth Sunday in May, thus becoming the first Triple Crown race to be run on a Sunday as opposed to a Saturday.

=== Other races ===
In 1981, NBC's SportsWorld broadcast the Arlington Million, the first thoroughbred race to feature a million-dollar prize payout. Dick Enberg hosted the broadcast alongside analyst Michael O'Hehir

In 2017, NBC began to carry coverage of Royal Ascot, the most significant meet in British thoroughbred racing. NBCSN carries coverage of the weekday sessions, while the Saturday session is carried by NBC.

As of 2024, NBC, with some coverage exclusive to CNBC or Peacock, also carries coverage of the California Crown Stakes, Breeders' Cup World Championships and Pegasus World Cup Championship Invitational Series.

== Announcers ==
Tom Hammond's tenure at NBC began in 1984, when he was named as a co-host of the inaugural Breeders' Cup, alongside Dick Enberg. Hammond was intended to host that year's race, however NBC executives were so impressed with his performance, that he ended up getting a long-term contract.

On March 24, 2001, less than two months before NBC was supposed to broadcast the Kentucky Derby for the very first time, Hammond underwent an operation for diverticulitis, a disease that affects the colon, which resulted in a portion of Hammond's colon being removed during the surgery. However, even with the short amount of time between the Derby and his operation, Hammond managed to get healthy enough to make his dream of broadcasting his home state's most famous sporting event become a reality on May 5, 2001.

Hammond was not so lucky in October 2002, when he underwent open-heart surgery, causing him to miss covering that year's Breeders' Cup (the only Breeders' Cup Hammond had not been a part of); Bob Costas, who was already a part of NBC's Triple Crown and Breeders' Cup coverage, working as mainly the "story set-up man" took Hammond's place at the hosting desk.

== Notable moments ==
2015 Belmont Stakes:

American Pharoah has opened up a two-length lead as they come to the top of the stretch. And Frosted has moved up into second. And they're into the stretch! And American Pharoah makes his run for glory as they come into the final furlong. Frosted is second with one-eighth of a mile to go. American Pharoah's got a two-length lead! Frosted is all out at the sixteenth pole. And here it is! The 37-year wait is over! American Pharoah is the one! American Pharoah has won the Triple Crown!

— Larry Collmus calling American Pharoah's win, making him the first Triple Crown winner since Affirmed in 1978.

2018 Belmont Stakes

A sixteenth to go. Justify is still there. Justify from Gronkowski—he's just perfect. And now he's just immortal! Justify is the 13th Triple Crown winner!

— Collmus calling Justify's run to the 2018 Triple Crown.

== Current rights ==
- Breeders' Cup Challenge (1984–2005, 2012–present)
  - Breeders' Cup Classic
  - Haskell Stakes
  - Kentucky Downs Turf Sprint Stakes
  - American Pharoah Stakes
  - Rodeo Drive Stakes
  - Oak Leaf Stakes
  - Thoroughbred Club of America Stakes
  - Coolmore Turf Mile Stakes
  - Breeders' Futurity Stakes
  - Bourbon Stakes
  - Spinster Stakes
  - Nashville Derby
- Kentucky Derby (2001–present)
  - Kentucky Oaks
- Preakness Stakes (2001–present)
  - Black-Eyed Susan Stakes
- Pegasus World Cup Series (2017–present)
  - Pegasus World Cup
  - Pegasus World Cup Turf
  - Pegasus World Cup Filly and Mare Turf Invitational
- Royal Ascot (2017–present)
- 1/ST RACING Tour (2023–present)
  - Arkansas Derby
  - Santa Anita Derby
  - Florida Derby
  - Louisiana Derby
  - Jeff Ruby Steaks
  - Fountain of Youth Stakes
  - Honey Fox Stakes
  - Canadian Turf Stakes
  - Holy Bull Stakes
  - Robert B. Lewis Stakes
  - Kitten's Joy Stakes
  - Swale Stakes
  - Forward Gal Stakes
  - Megahertz Stakes

== Nielsen ratings ==
During NBC's initial tenure as the Triple Crown broadcaster, average ratings for all three races were up by over 20%. Furthermore, the period from 2002 to 2004 saw the highest ratings for the Belmont Stakes.
