= Randy Moss (sports reporter) =

American sportswriter and announcer (born 1959)

Randy Moss (born 1959) is an American sports announcer and reporter who covers thoroughbred racing and Olympics for NBC Sports.

== Early life ==
Moss was born in 1959, in Hot Springs, Arkansas. He attended horse races at Oaklawn Park Race Track during his youth, often sneaking into the track despite being underage. During high school and college he assisted Daily Racing Form columnist Don Grisham on an Oaklawn handicapping column in the Arkansas Gazette. Moss then spent one semester in pharmacy school at the University of Arkansas before Gazette sports editor Orville Henry hired him to work for the paper full time.

== Print ==
In 1984, Moss left the Gazette for the Arkansas Democrat after the Democrat offered to double his salary due to his popularity as a handicapper. From 1989 to 1995, he worked for The Dallas Morning News.

Moss left journalism in 1995 and returned home to work as the director of operations for Oaklawn. In 1996, Moss returned to sports writing as a reporter for the Fort Worth Star-Telegram. He left the Star-Telegram in 1999 after he subbed as an ESPN analyst for that year's Preakness Stakes coverage and subsequently was offered a full-time job by the network.

For forty years, Moss has been part of Andrew Beyer's team that calculates for Daily Racing Form the iconic Beyer Speed Figures, a mathematical index measuring racehorse speed that is widely considered the most popular handicapping tool in thoroughbred racing. He also created the "Moss Pace Figures" formerly published online by Daily Racing Form.

== Television ==
In June 1999, Moss became ESPN's primary horse racing analyst. In August 2008, he concurrently joined the NFL Network, where for three years he was studio host for "Team Cam" and "Around the League" and a remote reporter from 2011 until leaving the network following the 2021 season.

In 2011, Moss began as an analyst for the Triple Crown for NBC and NBCSN and now covers horse racing exclusively for those networks. In addition to his horse racing analyst duties, Moss has handled reporter, host or play-by-play duties for a wide variety of other sports broadcasts on the NBC family of networks including college football, college basketball, golf, show jumping, two Super Bowls and seven Olympic Games. For Olympic coverage, he has been assigned to equestrian sports, biathlon, ski jumping, cross-country skiing, snowboarding and freestyle skiing, water polo, whitewater canoeing and kayaking, synchronized swimming and race walking.
