= Tom Hammond =

American sports commentator

- Born: Thomas Taylor Hammond; May 10, 1944 (age 82); Lexington, Kentucky, U.S.
- Alma mater: University of Kentucky
- Occupation: Sports commentator
- Years active: 1984–2021
- Employers: RCA (1984–1986); General Electric (1986–2013); Comcast (2013–2018)
- Television: NBC Sports (1984–2021)
- Spouse: Sheleigh Hammond
- Children: 3

Thomas Taylor Hammond (born May 10, 1944) is an American former sports commentator. Hammond began working with NBC Sports in 1984. Hammond is best known for his coverage of Thoroughbred Racing on NBC and Notre Dame Football on NBC.

Hammond also served as the play-by-play announcer for NBC's coverage of track and field at the Summer Olympic Games, speed skating events during the 2018 Winter Olympics and as a long-time play-by-play voice of the NFL on NBC.

== NBC Sports ==
=== Horse racing ===
While working at WLEX-TV in Lexington, Kentucky, Hammond's tenure at NBC began in 1984, when he was named as a co-host of the inaugural Breeders' Cup alongside Dick Enberg. It was supposed to be a one-shot deal for Hammond, but network execs were so impressed, he ended up getting a long-term contract. He was the main host of the network's thoroughbred racing coverage until Mike Tirico took over in 2017.

=== Football ===
Hammond's duties at NBC expanded to covering many other sports. He was the network's play-by-play voice for its coverage of Notre Dame football alongside analysts Pat Haden or Mike Mayock from 2000 to 2012. He was also the lead play-by-play man for The AFL on NBC.

From the 1985 NFL season until NBC lost the NFL on NBC after 1997 season, Hammond had a regular slot working regional Sunday games.

Hammond was considered the leading play-by-play candidate when NBC won the bidding for Sunday night NFL coverage beginning with the 2006 season, but ended up losing out to former ABC announcer Al Michaels after the latter signed with NBC. Hammond teamed with Cris Collinsworth to call the secondary Saturday Wild Card playoff game for NBC each year, including Chiefs-Colts in January 2007, Redskins-Seahawks in 2008, and Falcons-Cardinals in 2009, but teamed with Joe Gibbs and Joe Theismann for the Jets-Bengals Wild Card playoff game in January 2010. His final wild card game was Bengals-Texans on January 7, 2012.

Hammond and Collinsworth also serve as the announcing team on the Madden NFL 09 video game in 2008 and 2009, Madden NFL 10.

=== Olympics ===
Hammond also has been very much involved in NBC's Olympic Games coverage. At the Summer Olympics, Hammond served as the chief commentator for track and field, a position for which he debuted at the 1992 Summer Olympics in Barcelona, where his broadcast partner that year was O. J. Simpson. Hammond has since said that, prior to the O. J. Simpson murder case, he and Simpson were great friends and got along well. Hammond also commentates on other track and field events shown on NBC.

Hammond continued as the lead track and field commentator for the NBC through the 2016 Summer Olympics in Rio.

At the Winter Olympics, Hammond was the main commentator for figure skating and ice dancing from the 2002 Winter Olympics through the 2014 Winter Olympics.

For the 2018 Winter Olympics, Hammond moved to cover Speed Skating in what would be his final Olympic games.

=== Basketball ===
Hammond was a play by play announcer for the NBA on NBC for its entire run from 1990 through 2002. In the final years of NBA coverage he often worked a memorable three man booth with Steve "Snapper" Jones and Bill Walton.

== Regional sports ==
=== SEC basketball ===
In 1980, Hammond began regionally broadcasting Southeastern Conference basketball games. He continued with this package with various rights holders including TVS, Sports Productions Inc., Lorimar, Jefferson-Pilot, Lincoln Financial and Raycom Sports. Hammond concluded his work on SEC games at the end of the 2008–09 season after which ESPN became the rightsholder.

== Honors and awards ==
He was the first recipient of the annual Outstanding Kentuckian Award given by the A.B. Chandler Foundation, is a charter member of the Lafayette High School Hall of Fame and has been inducted into the Kentucky Journalism Hall of Fame, University of Kentucky Hall of Distinguished Alumni and Kentucky Sports Hall of Fame. Inducted into the KY Pro Football HOF in 2006.

== Career timeline ==
Year	Title	Role	Network
1980–2009	Regional SEC Basketball	Play-by-play	Various
1984–2016	Thoroughbred Racing on NBC	Host	NBC
1985–1998	NFL on NBC	Play-by-play	NBC
1990–2002	NBA on NBC	Play-by-play	NBC
1992–2018	NBC Olympics	Play-by-play	NBC
2000–2012	College Football on NBC	Play-by-play	NBC
2003–2006	AFL on NBC	Play-by-play	NBC
2006–2012	NFL on NBC	Play-by-play	NBC
2007	Thursday Night Football	Play-by-play (fill-in)	NFL Network
