= Bob Neumeier =

American sportscaster (1950–2021)

- Born: November 3, 1950; Weymouth, Massachusetts, U.S.
- Died: October 23, 2021 (aged 70); Plymouth, Massachusetts, U.S.
- Education: Syracuse University
- Occupation: Sports broadcaster
- Known for: Boston-based sports reporting, horse racing commentary
- Spouses: Lynn McCann (m. 1983; div. 1993) Michele Ucci (m. 2009)

Robert E. Neumeier (November 3, 1950 – October 23, 2021) was an American sportscaster for several Boston-area media outlets. He also appeared on NBC Sports, specializing in Thoroughbred racing.

== Early life ==
Neumeier was born on November 3, 1950, and grew up in Weymouth, Massachusetts, where he graduated from Weymouth High School in Massachusetts in 1968. After graduating from Syracuse University, Neumeier taught history for a short while at Weymouth High School, worked in the sports department of the Boston Globe, and did public relations work for the New England Whalers of the World Hockey Association (who later became the NHL's Hartford Whalers).

== Broadcasting career ==
=== Hartford Whalers ===
Neumeier's first job in broadcasting began in 1975 on WTIC in Hartford, Connecticut, where he called play-by-play of the Whalers, working with Bill Rasmussen and Larry Pleau; among their calls was the famous "Brawl at the Mall" in April 1975 during a playoff series with the Minnesota Fighting Saints. In 1979, Neumeier left the Whalers to become the sports anchor at WFSB in Hartford.

=== WBZ ===
In 1981, Bob Lobel replaced Roger Twibell as the principal sports anchor at WBZ-TV in Boston and recommended Neumeier for the position of weekend sports anchor. After only six months, Neumeier was replaced by Jerry Azar and reassigned to a reporting role. In 1989, WBZ promoted Neumeier to weekend sports anchor following the departure of Don Shane. Neumeier also co-hosted the Patriots Game Day Pre-Game Show with Tim Fox on WBZ radio from 1993 to 1995. In 1995, Neumeier became the play-by-play commentator for the Boston Bruins on WBZ Radio. He was succeeded as weekend sports anchor by Steve Burton, but remained with the station. By 2000, Neumeier had tired of traveling with the Bruins and saw WBZ-TV, where Bob Lobel was entrenched as the lead sports anchor, as a dead-end. He resigned as Bruins announcer after the 1999-2000 season and left WBZ-TV when his contract expired that summer.

=== Other work ===
From 1989 to 2000, Neumeier reported and handicapped on ESPN's coverage of Thoroughbred racing. He was the play-by-play announcer for the 1990 Frozen Four, which was broadcast on WFXT. In 1994 he was a reporter for some of the NHL on ABC's late-season and playoff games.

=== NBC Sports ===
In 1990, Neumeier defeated around 350 of the world's best handicappers to win the Caesars Palace World Series of Handicapping. That October, NBC hired him to serve as a roving reporter for its coverage of the Breeders’ Cup. For the 1991 Breeders’ Cup he was promoted to lead reporter, conducting interviews in the winner's circle. In 1992, Neumeier was moved to the handicapper's role. In 2001 he became a member of the broadcast team for the Triple Crown after NBC gained the rights to the races. During a May 1, 2009, telecast from Churchill Downs, Neumeier collapsed off the air and was taken to Audubon Hospital in Louisville, Kentucky. He missed the 2009 Kentucky Derby, but returned later that month for the 2009 Preakness Stakes. Neumeier was hospitalized after suffering a stroke on October 29, 2014. He was unable to attend the 2014 Breeders' Cup or the 2015 Kentucky Derby, but did appear on the Derby broadcast in a pre-recorded segment. The stroke affected his balance and coordination, but not his motor skills or speech. He returned for NBC's coverage of the 2015 Preakness Stakes.

Neumeier's work on NBC's horse racing coverage led to other opportunities at the network. In 1991, he was a reported for NBC's coverage of the American Cup gymnastics event. He was part of the network's team at the 1992 Summer Olympics, covering equestrian events. During the 2004 Summer Olympics, he was a reporter during track and field events. In 2006, he signed a three-year deal with NBC Sports, which saw him report on Football Night in America and host the network's NHL coverage as well continue his horse racing and Olympic duties. NBC did not renew his contract in 2009, but Neumeier remained a part of its horse racing coverage through 2016.

=== WEEI ===
After leaving WBZ, Neumeier freelanced as a college hockey announcer for FSN New England, a panelist on WSBK-TV’s "5th Quarter" Patriots postgame show, and as a Sunday morning co-host on WEEI during the baseball season.

In February 2002, Neumeier replaced Eddie Andelman as Dale Arnold’s co-host on WEEI's midday show. Neumeier joined WEEI at a time when the station, which was also home to Dennis and Callahan and The Big Show, experienced an explosion in popularity. In 2005, Neumeier left Dale & Neumy, which was the highest-rated show in its time slot, after he and Entercom failed to come to terms on a contract.

=== Later work ===
After leaving WEEI, Neumeier spent most of his time in Miami. In 2009 he married a woman who worked in Boston, which resulted in him returning to New England. He worked as a fill-in host for both WEEI and its competitor WBZ-FM. In 2010 he joined CSN New England as an anchor of its SportsNet Central program. He remained with CSN until 2016, when he was let go in a cost-cutting move.

== Death ==
Neumeier died on October 23, 2021. He had suffered from congestive heart failure and heart disease and had been in hospice care for the eight weeks prior to his death. The city of Louisville subsequently named a street in his honor, Neumeier Place.
