= Mike Battaglia =

American horse racing analyst, race caller and television broadcaster

Mike Battaglia is an American horse racing analyst, race caller and television broadcaster. He is most closely associated with Churchill Downs, the Kentucky Derby and as the on-air talent for Keeneland Racecourse with Katie Gensler.

== Career ==
Battaglia, a native of Covington, Kentucky, has worked most of his career at Churchill and Turfway Park. He has set the morning line odds at Churchill since 1974, and was the race announcer there from 1977 to 1996. He left his position as analyst for simulcast racing in 2008.

Battaglia is also the morning line oddsmaker for Turfway Park and Keeneland. His son Bret was the morning line oddsmaker for Ellis Park in 2010 and 2011, and has been the oddsmaker at Turfway Park since December 2013.

Battaglia was a member of the NBC Sports broadcast team for the Kentucky Derby and the Preakness Stakes from when the network gained broadcast rights in 2001 until 2016. He also worked the Belmont Stakes for NBC from 2001 through 2005, the Breeders' Cup from 1993 through 2005, and various other races televised by NBC from 1993 onward.

Mike Battaglia was in the 2010 movie Secretariat as well as the 1999 film Nice Guys Sleep Alone.

In 2017 Battaglia was inducted into the Kentucky Athletic Hall of Fame.
