= Bryan Field =

Philip Bryan Field was an American horse racing writer, announcer, and track manager. He is credited as one of the first people to apply the term "Triple Crown" to the Kentucky Derby, Preakness Stakes, and Belmont Stakes.

== Biography ==
Field announced races for CBS television, CBS radio, and Mutual Broadcasting System. As a broadcaster he was noted for his "Irish-British-New York accent". He also went by the name Thomas Bryan George during his early radio career.

He also served as turf editor of The New York Times. In his June 8, 1930, column he wrote that Gallant Fox had "completed his triple crown" by winning the Belmont Stakes. This is one of the first known mentions of the term "Triple Crown" in American horse racing.

Field was also general manager of Delaware Park Racetrack. He was praised for managing to reopen the track in 1944 after it had closed the previous year as a result of World War II.

Field died on December 15, 1968, of a heart attack at the age of 68.

In 1980, he was inducted into the Delaware Sports Hall of Fame.
