= Frank I. Wright =

American racehorse trainer (1921–1992)

Personal information
- Born: June 8, 1921
- Died: December 5, 1992 (aged 71) Aiken, South Carolina
- Occupation: Trainer

Horse racing career
- Sport: Horse racing

Major racing wins
- Whitney Handicap (1957); Grey Lag Handicap (1957); Excelsior Stakes (1958); New York Stakes (1968); Sheepshead Bay Stakes (1968); Modesty Handicap (1968); Suwannee River Stakes (1968); Sanford Stakes (1969); Maskette Stakes (1970); Westchester Handicap (1980); Affectionately Handicap (1983); Top Flight Handicap (1983); Next Move Handicap (1984)

Frank I. Wright (1921–1992) was an American Thoroughbred horse racing trainer and television commentator.

== Early life ==
Wright was born on June 8, 1921. His father owned horses in Illinois. During the summer, Wright worked at the stables and traveled with his father's horses.

== Training career ==
Wright began training horses in 1947. His horses included Ludham (winner of Modesty Handicap, Suwannee River Stakes, Sheepshead Bay Stakes, and New York Stakes), Kingmaker (who won the Whitney, Grey Lag and Excelsior Handicaps in 1957), Adept, Walker's, Nice Catch, and Brian Brian Boru.

== Broadcasting career ==
Wright got his start in broadcasting announcing races locally in New York and Maryland. After Canonero II won the 1971 Kentucky Derby, Wright was hired by CBS as an analyst for its horse racing coverage. The network felt that his ability to speak Spanish would allow him to speak with the horse's owner, trainer and jockey.

== Later life and death ==
Wright stopped training in 1986. He died on December 5, 1992, of a heart attack at his home in Aiken, South Carolina. He was 71 years old.
