= Ahmed Fareed =

TV studio host and reporter

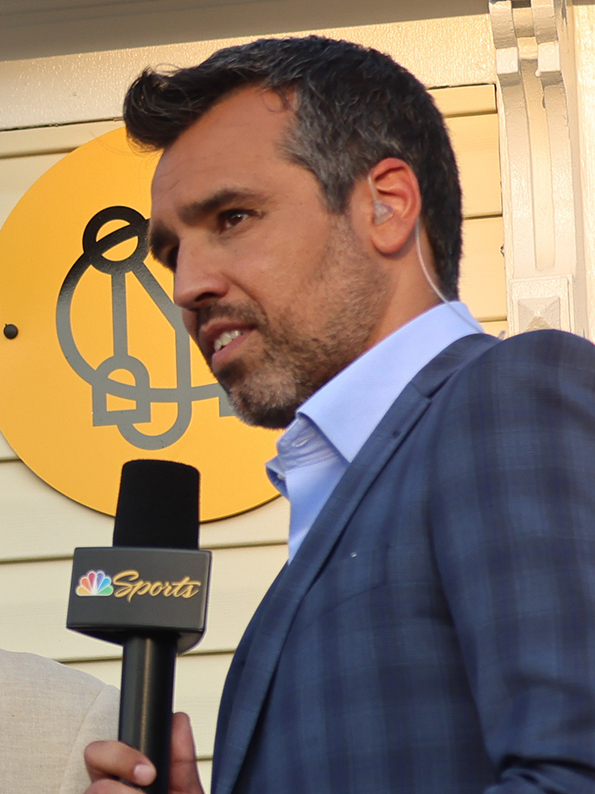
- Fareed in 2022
- Citizenship: American
- Education: Syracuse University
- Occupation: Sportscaster
- Employer: NBC Sports

Ahmed Fareed is an American studio host and sports reporter for American television network NBC Sports.

== Early life ==
Fareed is a native of Sparta, Michigan, where he played quarterback for the Spartans. After graduating from Sparta in 1998, Fareed spent one year at Michigan State University, before transferring to Syracuse University. He graduated from the S. I. Newhouse School of Public Communications in 2002 with a degree in Broadcast Journalism.

== Career ==
Fareed started off his career for one year at WXMI-TV, and became a weekend sports anchor for WILX-TV and WSYM-TV in Lansing, Michigan. Fareed then moved to WAVY-TV in Portsmouth, Virginia, where he spent five years covering local sports. There, he covered the Washington Redskins, the Norfolk Tides, Virginia Tech Hokies, and the Virginia Cavaliers.

Prior to his work at NBC Sports Bay Area in San Francisco, he was employed with MLB Network from 2011 to 2012, where he appeared regularly on studio programming including MLB Tonight and Quick Pitch. Fareed has also served as a studio host on USA Network and NBCSN for the 2016 Summer and 2018 Winter Olympic games.

In February 2019, NBC Sports Net announced that Fareed was leaving his position in the Bay Area to join their headquarters in Stamford, Connecticut, where he will be covering various sports including Premiership Rugby.

In July 2021, Fareed also served as a studio host on NBCSN and Olympic Channel for the 2020 Tokyo Olympics.

In 2022, Fareed started serving as the field reporter for MLB games on Peacock. In November, he hosted the 2022 Golden Goggle Awards at the Marriott Marquis in New York City.

Fareed is currently a co-host on College Countdown, NBC's pregame show for its college football and college basketball coverage and contributes to NBC's horse racing and Premier League coverage, most notably during the 2025 Kentucky Derby, when he replaced Mike Tirico after he had to step away from hosting coverage of it when he had a significant reaction to his nut allergy. During the 2023 NFL season, Fareed also hosted Football Night in America due to Maria Taylor going on maternity leave. Fareed had previously filled in as host when Taylor hosted from the Sunday Night Football game site, or, during the 2020 season, when Tirico filled in for Al Michaels, and Liam McHugh was unavailable to host in studio. Fareed would later replace Taylor as host of Big Ten College Countdown beginning in 2025 so that Taylor could focus on her NBA hosting duties, while also being named host of a Monday night NBA studio show on Peacock.

He also co-hosts the Chris Simms Unbuttoned podcast with NFL analyst and former quarterback Chris Simms.

On February 5, 2026, it was announced that Fareed will serve as host of the 2026 Milan-Cortina Winter Olympics, beginning in Milan on February 6, 2026, as a result of Craig Melvin (who was originally chosen to host) withdrawing from Olympics coverage due to the disappearance of fellow Today Show co-anchor Savannah Guthrie's mother, Nancy Guthrie, which occurred on January 31, 2026.

On February 15, 2026, it was announced that Fareed will serve as substitute host of the 2026 NBA All-Star Game

== Personal life ==
Fareed married Cathleen Fareed in November 2011.
