= Fred Capossela =

American horse race announcer

Fred "Cappy" Capossela (1902 – April 3, 1991) was an American thoroughbred race track announcer.

== Early life and career ==
Capossela was born in Brooklyn in 1902. He got his start in thoroughbred racing in 1926 as a writer for the New York Evening Post. He also covered the sport for the Brooklyn Eagle. In 1934, Capossela called his first race at Tropical Park, where he filled in for the regular announcer for two weeks.

== Announcing ==
In 1940, Capossela became assistant track announcer for New York's four thoroughbred race tracks, Aqueduct Racetrack, Belmont Park, Saratoga Race Course, and Jamaica Race Course. Three years later he was promoted to lead announcer. He also called races at Florida's Hialeah Park Race Track. From 1950 to 1960, Capossela was the "Voice of the Triple Crown" on CBS Radio and Television. He also called televised races on WNEW-TV's Schaefer Circle of Sports.

Capossela was known for his high-pitched nasal voice, his distinctive style in saying "It is now post time", and his accurate calls.

== Late life and death ==
Capossela retired in 1971. After his retirement, he regularly attended weekend races at Hialeah and later at tracks in Southern California. Capossela died on April 3, 1991, at his home in Upland, California, following a stroke.

In 1993, the Swift Stakes at Aqueduct Racetrack was renamed the Fred "Cappy" Capossela Stakes in his honor.
