= Nick Luck =

English racing broadcaster (born 1978)

- Born: Nicholas Edward Francis Luck; 28 June 1978 (age 47)
- Years active: 2004-present

Nicholas Edward Francis Luck (born 28 June 1978) is an English racing broadcaster, who previously presented Channel 4 Racing on Channel 4.

He is part of the NBC Breeders Cup team and is eight times Horserace Writers' & Photographers' Association Broadcaster of the Year.

Luck has acted as a paid promoter of bookmaker William Hill.

In 2017, he became the BBC Equestrian commentator taking over from Mike Tucker, and has since covered the Olympia Horse Show, Badminton Horse Trials, Burghley Horse Trials and the Olympic Games for the BBC.

The Nick Luck Daily podcast is available on a number of platforms

He was a member of British horseracing's Whip Consultation Steering Group which in mid-2022 produced 20 recommendations relating to the use of the whip in British racing, all of which were approved by the Board of the British Horseracing Authority (BHA) and were published with other review documentation on 12 July 2022.
