= Jack Whitaker =

American sportscaster (1924–2019)

- Born: John Francis Whitaker; May 18, 1924; Philadelphia, Pennsylvania, U.S.
- Died: August 18, 2019 (aged 95); Devon, Pennsylvania, U.S.
- Occupations: Sportscaster & writer
- Spouses: Bertha Raring Whitaker (m. 1950; div. 1990); Nancy Chaffee Whitaker (m. 1991; died 2002); Patricia Whitaker (m. 2005)
- Children: 6
- Awards: Philadelphia Sports Hall of Fame (2007)

John Francis Whitaker (May 18, 1924 – August 18, 2019) was an American sportscaster who worked for both CBS and ABC. Whitaker was a decorated army veteran of World War II. He fought in the Normandy Campaign and was wounded by an artillery strike.

== Biography ==
=== Early life and career ===
Whitaker was born and raised in Philadelphia, Pennsylvania. After graduating from Northeast Catholic High School in 1941 and Saint Joseph's University in 1947, Whitaker began his broadcasting career at WPAM in Pottsville, Pennsylvania. In 1950, he moved to WCAU where he did local weather broadcasts as well as other local announcing duties. He continued to work for CBS' Philadelphia station while beginning to take assignments for the network.

=== CBS Sports ===
Whitaker entered network sports in 1961 at CBS, where he did play-by-play for the Philadelphia Eagles of the NFL and hosted the anthology series CBS Sports Spectacular among other duties. He worked for CBS for more than two decades. Whitaker is probably best remembered for his coverage of golf and horse racing. He covered thoroughbred racing's Triple Crown Events, golf's four major championships, the first Super Bowl, championship boxing, the National Professional Soccer League in 1967, the North American Soccer League a year later, and Major League Baseball. Whitaker was a studio host for The NFL Today at CBS, the network's pre-game show.

Whitaker was banned from covering the Masters golf tournament for CBS after tournament chairman Clifford Roberts took offense when he said "Here comes the mob" in reference to the arrival of the gallery at the 18th hole of the Augusta National Golf Club at the end of a playoff in 1966. Six years later he was invited by CBS to attend the 1972 Masters as a spectator, but when Henry Longhurst became ill, he was asked to take over as telecaster, and he continued to telecast in the following years.

With the death of Dick Enberg on December 21, 2017, Whitaker was the only living play-by-play announcer from the first 21 Super Bowls. He had been the only living television broadcaster from the first seven Super Bowls since the death of Frank Gifford on August 9, 2015.

=== ABC Sports and ABC News ===
Moving to ABC in 1982, Whitaker served as a reporter for both news and sports divisions. He was a part of ABC's sports team at the 1988 Winter Olympic Games, the 1984 Winter and Summer Olympic Games and the 1990 Little League World Series. He also reported sports for ABC's World News Tonight, Nightline, and 20/20. He retired from the network in 1993.

=== Death ===
Whitaker died on August 18, 2019, in Devon, Pennsylvania, during his sleep from natural causes.

== Honors ==
Whitaker won three Emmy Awards for Outstanding Host or Commentator in 1979, for writing in 1990 and the Lifetime Achievement award in 2012. The Broadcast Pioneers of Philadelphia named Whitaker their Person of the Year in 1981 and inducted him into their Hall of Fame in 2003.

Preceded by Frank Gifford	The NFL Today host 1971–1974	Succeeded by Brent Musburger
Preceded by First	Super Bowl television play-by-play announcer (NFC package carrier); 1966 (with Ray Scott for the first half)	Succeeded by Ray Scott alone
