= Jack Drees =

American sports broadcaster (1917–1988)

John Henry Drees (February 8, 1917 – July 27, 1988) was an American sportscaster who worked for ABC and CBS, as well as various stations in Chicago.

== Early life and career ==
Drees was born on February 8, 1917, in Chicago. He attended Austin High School and the University of Iowa, where he was an all-Big Ten center on the Iowa Hawkeyes men's basketball team. After graduating, he went to work for WJJD in Chicago as a secondary baseball play-by-play announcer to John Harrington. His first day on the air was May 23, 1938. In addition to baseball, Drees also called National Football League games and horse races from Sportsman's Park for WJJD and sister station WIND. Although he had never seen a horse race prior to calling one, Drees became "the most accurate and respected horse race announcer in the country" according to Jack Brickhouse.

== US Navy ==
During World War II, Drees served 35 months in the United States Navy. He served 33 months at sea as a gunnery officer on a merchant ship and rose to the rank of lieutenant.

== Los Angeles ==
After the war, Drees returned to WJJD and WIND, but the stations had dropped their sports coverage. He later moved to Los Angeles, where he called horse races and served as Public Relations director for the Los Angeles Dons of the All-America Football Conference. After the league folded in 1949, he returned to Chicago, where he called horse races and college football.

== Television ==
=== National ===
Drees first television role was co-hosting Pabst Blue Ribbon Bouts with Russ Hodges. His television broadcast of the 1963 Sonny Liston-Floyd Patterson world heavyweight championship fight drew the largest audience in history up to that point. In 1954, he was hired by ABC to announce college football games with Tom Harmon. In 1960, he was hired by CBS to call St. Louis Cardinals football games. In 1967/68 he called Super Bowl I and II for the CBS Radio Network. In addition to NFL games, Drees also called college football, golf, and horse races for CBS. He was the broadcaster for the 1971 contest between the Chicago Bears and Detroit Lions which would see Detroit wide receiver Chuck Hughes collapse toward its conclusion, eventually becoming the only NFL player to date who died during a game. Drees returned to ABC, and in 1972, hosted a 5-minute daily broadcast on the American Information Radio Network.

=== Chicago ===
During the 1960s, Drees broadcast the Illinois state high school basketball tournaments on WGN-TV. He also hosted a program on WGN-TV called "Sports Unlimited". He was the play-by-play voice for Chicago White Sox telecasts on WFLD from 1968 through 1972. His broadcast partners were Dave Martin (1968), Mel Parnell (1969), Billy Pierce (1970) and Bud Kelly (1971–1972).

== Later career and retirement ==
In 1974, Drees and James C. Mullen published a book entitled Where Is He Now? Sports Heroes of Yesterday - Revisited. From 1977 to 1985, he worked for WKRG-TV in Mobile, Alabama. In 1986, he retired to Dallas.

Drees died on July 27, 1988, of cancer at his Dallas home. He was 71 years old.

== Personal life ==
Drees and his wife Mary were married on August 16, 1939. They had three children. Drees' son Brian was also a sportscaster, notably working for KMGH in Denver.
