= Race caller =

Sportscaster in various racing events

A race caller is a public-address announcer or sportscaster who describes the progress of a race, either for on-track or radio and TV fans. They are most prominent in horse racing, auto racing, and track-and-field events.

Among the jobs of a race caller is to identify the positions of various entrants during the race, and point out any sudden moves made by them. In horse racing, many callers also point out the posted fractions—the times at which the lead horse reached the quarter-mile, half-mile and similar points of a race.

A race-caller who specifically describes the event over a racetrack's public-address system is the track announcer. In horse racing, track announcers handle up to nine or ten races per day; more on special stakes-race days.

Most horse-race callers memorize the horses' and jockeys' (or drivers in harness racing) silks and the horses' colors before the race, to be able to quickly identify each entrant.

== History ==
=== Australia ===
Arnold 'Ike' Treloar was the first person to call the races on radio when he broadcast the thoroughbred events at Port Adelaide, South Australia, in 1924 for radio station 5CL. As one of the pioneers of race calling in Australia, he broadcast for the next 21 years, mostly for the Australian Broadcasting Commission (ABC). Within a year, race callers were describing events across Australia for their radio audiences. The earliest callers included Mick Ferry in Sydney, Bill Priestly in Melbourne, Keith Gollan in Western Australia, and Mick Flanagan in Brisbane. Priestly became the first person to call the famed Melbourne Cup when he described the win by Windbag at Flemington Racecourse in 1925.

In the early years of race calling in Australia, race callers were forced to broadcast from structures outside the racecourse, as the race clubs objected to them, fearing that patrons would listen to the radio rather than attend the track and patronise off-course bookmakers. Buildings and temporary stands overlooking the tracks, even trees, were utilised by the pioneer callers.

The issue came to a head in 1937 when the Victoria Park Racing Company, the organisation that conducted race meetings in Adelaide sought court orders to prevent Cyril Angles, one of the most popular callers of the pre-World War II era, broadcasting from an elevated platform outside the course. Eventually, the High Court of Australia found in favour of the broadcasters, the Chief Justice, Sir John Latham, observing that "some people prefer hearing about the races as seen by Angles to seeing the races for themselves."

As radio audiences surged in the pre-World War II years, more stations employed race callers. The leading callers of the era included Jim Anderson at 4BC Brisbane, who had started his career on the course public address system; Eric Welsh, the doyen of Australian race callers, who commenced with 3AR, Melbourne, in 1926, which became the ABC in 1932, until joining 3DB in 1934, where he remained for the next 20 years; Lachie Melville in Sydney; and Fred Tupper in Sydney and Melbourne.

A new generation of race callers filled the airwaves after World War II. Three of the broadcast from Melbourne included Joe Brown, Bert Bryant and Bill Collins. A fourth, Ken Howard, filled the airwaves from Sydney.

Starting as an assistant in Hobart in 1946, Joe Brown won the premier caller role for the ABC in Melbourne in 1947, following the retirement of Jim Carroll. Brown called Rimfire's win in his first broadcast of Australia's most famous race, the 2 mile (now 3,200 metres) handicap, the Melbourne Cup, in 1948. For the next three decades, millions of Australians listened to his calls, both on the national broadcaster and on-course at the four Melbourne race courses, Flemington, Caulfield, Moonee Valley and Sandown Park, before he retired in 1981, having broadcast a record 34 Melbourne Cups. His smooth, lucid style was typical of the Australian callers in the post-war period. After attending the races in Melbourne during his coverage of the 1956 Olympic Games, the famous American sports writer, Red Smith, wrote about Joe Brown: "Flemington's incomparable race caller described every stride with vivid detachment . . . No matter how great the field, he calls every horse at every post, salting it with enlightened comment."

After starting his career at country race tracks in New South Wales, Bert Bryant rose to prominence as one of Australia's most colourful callers at Radio 3UZ in Melbourne, where he was the number one caller for 30 years. His witty descriptions are fabled: a front runner had "a wing on every foot"; a horse racing wide on the home turn "covered more ground than the early explorers"; and a runner tailed off would "need a lantern to find his way home", amongst them. Bryant called 28 Melbourne Cups and many other prominent races, including the match race between Rain Lover and Big Philou in the 1970 Queen Elizabeth Stakes. His call of Think Big's win in the 1974 Melbourne Cup was an example of the colourful style that attracted many listeners.

Known as 'the accurate one', Bill Collins started his race calling career when the regular course commentator failed to arrive at the Lindenow races in East Gippsland in 1943. He subsequently called for Radio 3TR Sale, before joining Radio 3DB Melbourne as an understudy to Eric Welsh. He became the chief caller in 1954, calling Rising Fast's win in his first Melbourne Cup description that year. Collins went on to call 34 Melbourne Cups in a long career. His famous calls included the WS Cox Plate when Kingston Town won for a third time in 1982, and the great duel between the New Zealand thoroughbreds, Bonecrusher and Our Waverley Star, in 1986. Collins was a talented commentator, also calling both Harness Racing and the Olympic Games. He was a versatile media performer, appearing on television regularly, and winning a television Logie in 1959.

Ken Howard called his first race in New South Wales in 1936 before joining Radio 3XY Melbourne in 1939. When the Melbourne station discontinued race broadcasting, Howard returned to Sydney, joining Radio 2UE in 1941 and 2GB in the early 1950s. Despite coming from Sydney, Howard called 32 Melbourne Cups during his annual coverage of the Flemington Spring Carnival. A recording of his 1941 Melbourne Cup, won by Skipton, portrays the voice familiar to radio listeners for decades.Ken Howard Calls the Melbourne Cup Howard's description of an odds-on favourite, as "London to a brick on" has become one of the best-known sayings in Australian racing. His great rival on the Sydney airwaves was Des Hoystead, who worked for a number of radio stations before a 20-year stint at 2UE from 1964 to 1983. Hoystead called 20 Melbourne Cups during annual visits to Victoria for the spring carnival.

The other renowned Sydney race caller of the era was Geoff Mahoney, who worked as an understudy for Ken Howard before replacing Lachie Melville as the chief caller for the ABC. Mahoney was also a sought-after caller of boxing during his career. Many of the leading Sydney race callers were nurtured in their careers by Clif Cary, the prominent sports editor of the era.

Other leading callers of the era included Bert Day and John O'Neil in Adelaide and Vince Curry in Brisbane. O'Neil who had started his career at the Barmera Trotting Club in 1949, went on to call 27 Adelaide Cups and 27 Great Eastern Steeplechases at Oakbank in a long career. Although most callers worked for radio and television stations, a few were chiefly the course broadcaster, notable amongst them, Frank O'Brien at the Flemington and Moonee Valley racecourses in Melbourne.

By the early 1980s, a new generation of race callers were broadcasting on radio and television. In Melbourne, they included John Russell, Bryan Martin, Bruce McAvaney, Clem Dimsey and Greg Miles. Russell had commenced calling both professional athletics and horse racing in the mid-1950s for 3UZ.

Bryan Martin began his radio career with 3AW, Melbourne, in the mid-1960s before moving the 5DN Adelaide as a junior race caller. He returned to Melbourne's 3UZ in 1972 before joining 3DB in 1984. He became the chief caller at Radio 927 in 1988, TVN in 2005, retiring in 2007. His memorable calls include Fields of Omagh, a horse he co-owned, twice winning Australia's premier Weight-for-Age race, the WS Cox Plate at Moonee Valley; and Better Loosen Up's victory in the 1990 Japan Cup. Martin called races in Dubai, PNG, New Zealand, Hong Kong and Canada. He called 20 Melbourne Cups, and was awarded a Medal of the Order of Australia for his services to racing and charity.

Bruce McAvaney commenced his celebrated sports commentary career as a race caller with Radio 5DN, Adelaide, in 1976 before joining Television station ADS-7. He moved to Melbourne in 1983, broadcasting for Television 10. He called the Melbourne Cup from 1985–1988. McAvaney has called the Olympic Games since 1980, Australian Rules Football, tennis, athletics and motor racing. He was awarded the Medal of the Order of Australia in 2002 and inducted into the Sports Australia Hall of Fame the same year.

Greg Miles called his first Melbourne Cup in 1981 at age 22 after Joe Brown retired from the ABC. He went on to call a record 36 Melbourne Cups, broadcasting for the ABC, Sky, Radio 927, and Racing.com in a 40-year career. His last Group 1 call was the William Reid Stakes at Moonee Valley in 2017. Miles was the course broadcaster at Flemington, Caulfield, Moonee Valley and Sandown racecourses in Melbourne. He was awarded a Medal of the Order of Australia in 2016.

Ian Craig and John Tapp became the leading callers in Sydney. Craig began his career calling greyhound races at Richmond, NSW, and harness racing. His first thoroughbred race call was at Gosford, also the scene of his last after 44 years in the job. In 1965, he became the number two caller to Des Hoystead at Radio 2UE, before taking the chief calling position at 2KY in 1968, remaining with the station until 2009.

John Tapp broadcast his first race at Canterbury in 1964, After filling in for Ken Howard while he was on holidays, he was appointed his understudy at 2GB. When Howard retired in 1973, Tapp became the chief race caller until the station discontinued race broadcasts in 1981. He moved to 2UE as the assistant to Des Hoystead, becoming the number one caller in 1983 until that station also discontinued broadcasts. Tapp also worked for TCN Channel 9 and later for Sky Channel until retiring in 1998. Although the chief thoroughbred caller in Sydney, one of his best known calls was Mt Eden's victory in the 1971 Miracle Mile at Harold Park Paceway. John Tapp was awarded the Medal of the Order of Australia in 1996.

Ray Fewings became the voice of the turf in Adelaide on Radio 5DN after Bryan Martin moved to 3UZ in Melbourne in 1972. A young Darren McAullay commenced a long career as the chief caller at 6PR Perth in 1980 after broadcasting in rural Western Australia. In Brisbane, Wayne Wilson who was an understudy to Vince Curry at 4BC calling harness racing, became the chief thoroughbred caller in 1983, a position he held until 2010.

Darren Flindell became the chief caller for Sydney racing in 2015, having spent the previous 16 years with the Hong Kong Jockey Club, the last eight as chief caller at Sha Tin and Happy Valley. Flindell began his career as the course commentator at Wenworth Park greyhounds and Harold Park Paceway before joining Ian Craig at 2KY in 1991 and Sky Racing in 1995.

Matt Hill, the chief caller in Melbourne with Racing.com since 2017, began in radio as a technical assistant to Greg Miles and Bryan Martin at 3UZ. He was the chief caller for Sky Racing in Sydney from 2000–2015. Hill was part of the BBC commentary team for the Grand National from 2004–2009. He has called many other sports, including the Olympic Games, tennis, and speed skating. Terry Bailey, who started his race calling career in Queensland before joining TVN in 2005, was appointed the Senior Caller at Racing.com when Hill was made the chief caller. He calls at the races at Moonee Valley on Friday nights and the major non-metropolitan meetings.

In Adelaide, Terry McAuliffe was the chief caller for 20 years before retiring in 2019. He had also broadcast the Commonwealth Games and the London Olympics. Brett Davis returned from Hong Kong to replace McAuliffe as the chief caller in Adelaide. Davis had commenced his career calling the greyhound races at Gawler in 1979. He worked for three years in Tasmania before becoming the caller in Singapore for two years. Davis spent 14 years in Hong Kong, replacing Darren Flindell as the chief English language caller in 2015.

Many Australian race callers have worked overseas. Jim McGrath took a position as English language caller with the Hong Kong Jockey Club in 1973. In 1984, he called races at Phoenix Park, Dublin and at the Ebor meeting at York. He joined the BBC in 1993, succeeding Sir Peter O'Sullevan as the chief caller in 1997, a position he retained until the broadcast rights were transferred to Channel 4 in 2012. McGrath returned to Australia annually, calling 20 Melbourne Cups during his career.

Terry Spargo called in Dubai for 17 years having commenced his career in Queensland in 1977 before moving to the UAE in 1993.

Two Australians, Rob Geller and Michael Wrona, called races in the US for many years. Geller began race calling at Wangaratta in 1984 then becoming the course broadcaster at other tracks in northern Victoria. In 1989, Geller became the English language caller in Hong Kong where he worked for six and a half years before moving to Emerald Downs in Washington State in 1996. Since the 2000–2001 season, Geller was also the track broadcaster at Sunland Park, New Mexico. In 2015, The Australian succeeded Dan Loiselle as the race caller at Woodbine Park, Toronto.

Michael Wrona called his first race at Brunette Downs, Queensland, in 1983. In 1985, he filled in for Alan Thomas at 4BC, Brisbane. In 1990, he became the caller at Hollywood Park, Los Angeles. He replaced the South African caller, Trevor Denman, at Santa Anita in 2016, calling there for two years. Wrona has called at many US racecourse, including Arlington, Del Mar, Bay Meadows and Kentucky Downs.

Mark McNamara called at Canterbury, New Zealand for a decade before joining former New Zealand caller, Tom Wood, in Hong Kong in 2020.

In the earlier decades of race calling, most callers described the three codes – Thoroughbreds, Standardbreds (harness racing) and Greyhounds. While many commenced their careers calling the greyhounds or harness racing before moving to the thoroughbreds, some concentrated on the other codes. Amongst the harness racing callers, they have included Bruce Skeggs who was the resident caller at the Royal Melbourne Showgrounds and Moonee Valley Harness Racing. He called 20 Inter Dominion Championships before retiring in 1982. More recently, Dan Mielicki, has been the chief harness racing caller in Melbourne, Fred Hastings in Sydney and Chris Barsby in Brisbane.

Others who specialised in greyhound racing include Paul Ambrosoli in Sydney and the father and son team, Maurie and Wayne Kirby in Melbourne. Both were also boxing commentators.

==== Other sports ====
A number of other Australian sports commonly employ race callers, both at the venue and on radio and television, including athletics, cycling and the various forms of motor racing. Some also call horse racing, but many specialised in other sports.

=== New Zealand ===
Both on-course and radio broadcasts of New Zealand races commenced prior to World War II.

Bruce Clarkson, the pioneer of radio broadcasts, called his first race for the Banks Peninsula Racing Club at Motukarara in 1937. Spanning 31 years, he called the thoroughbred races at Riccarton and Trentham and the harness races at Addington Raceway.

Another long time caller in the Canterbury region was Reon Murtha, who broadcast his first race at Reefton in 1960. In a 47-year career, he called at Riccarton Park and Addington Raceway. He was a familiar voice of Radio NZ. Murtha was made a member of the New Zealand Order of Merit in 2004.

Alby Gain was the caller at Alexandra Park harness racing in Auckland for 27 years, after replacing Reg Clapp in 1983. George Simon succeeded him in 1983.

Keith Haub was the resident caller at Auckland's Ellerslie Racecourse from 1997 to 2004. Haub had called in Vancouver for two years before being employed at Ellerslie. Haub called many overseas races, including the Melbourne Cup and the W.S. Cox Plate in Australia. He called in the U.S. and provided the first English language call of the Japan Cup in 1983.

George Simon is one of New Zealand's best known race callers. He called at Kranji Racecourse in Singapore, for three years before returning to New Zealand.

=== South Africa ===
One of the earliest South African callers was Ernie Duffield.

Former South African caller, Trevor Denman, became internationally known as the voice of Santa Anita Park in Arcadia, California, from 1983 to 2016. Denman had called at Clairwood, Greyville, and Scottville in South Africa before moving to the United States.

Other South African callers of note include Alistair Cohen at Johannesburg, Johan Malherbe at Cape Town, and Craig and Sheldon Peters at Durban.

=== United States ===
The earliest known race calls occurred with megaphones long before the Public address system existed. In horse racing, the most well-known gentlemen was Jack Adler who started getting involved in racing as early as 1877 as a teenager. The Guttenberg Racetrack in North Bergen, New Jersey, had an official announcer who broke down providing a segue to announcing for Adler in the early 1890s. He was famous for the phrase "ALLLLLLL Right!!!" In auto racing, Frederick William Burns was selected.

In November 1900, he was the announcer at the first New York Auto Show in Manhattan. His announcing career goes back to bicycle racing in the late 19th century when he became well known as the first professional megaphoner. Fred Burns was the first announcer of any kind in athletics dating back to 1884 and Staten Island Athletic Club games. As an aside, Jack Adler and Fred Burns were friends, worked in boxing together and even announced baseball as a tandem for the New York Giants.

An early race call happened at Agua Caliente Racetrack in Tijuana, Mexico. On February 5, steward George Schilling called their first race. He started immediately to develop future race callers Clem McCarthy and Joe Hernandez.

Among the earliest prominent race callers was Clem McCarthy. According to the book Sports on New York Radio, McCarthy was hired in 1927 as the first track announcer at Arlington Park in Arlington Heights, Illinois, one of the first thoroughbred racetrack with a public-address system. He later gained national fame calling important horse races for the NBC Radio Network, including the Kentucky Derby, starting in 1929.

Other prominent race callers were early sportscasters Ted Husing, Bill Stern, and Marty Glickman, all of whom called horse racing and track-and-field events during their careers.

The best-known horse-race callers since the dawn of the television age have been Chic Anderson, Dave Johnson, Trevor Denman and Tom Durkin. All four gained acclaim not only as public-address announcers but network sportscasters, providing pre-race analyses and features for national fans as well as the race calls.

Other prominent horse-race callers past and present day include Marshall Cassidy, Cawood Ledford, Fred Capposella, Luke Kruytbosch, Michael Wrona, Joe Hernandez, John Dooley, Frank Mirahmadi, Robert Geller, Phil Georgeff, Kurt Becker, Vic Stauffer, Mike Battaglia, John Scully, John Curran, Dave Rodman, Paul Allen, Richard Grunder and Terry Wallace.

In New England, at Suffolk Downs in East Boston, Massachusetts, and Rockingham Park in Salem, New Hampshire, an announcer, Babe Rubenstein, called races for decades, starting in the 1930s. Rubenstein, it was said, never miscalled a race. He was working at Rockingham Park on the day of the 1938 hurricane, when the winds are said to have blown off the broadcast booth from the top of the grandstand. An often told story in the 1950s had it that Rubenstein was contacted by one networks, for possible employment on a national level, as opposed to his work in New England. As part of the proposed contract, he would have to change his name. He refused, saying, "I was born Babe Rubenstein and I will die Babe Rubenstein." Jim Hannon was another prominent race caller in New England.
