= Dave Johnson (announcer) =

American announcer and sportscaster (born 1941)

- Born: May 25, 1941
- Sports commentary career
- Sport: Thoroughbred horse racing

Dave Johnson (born May 25, 1941) is an American announcer and sportscaster, best known for his work in horse racing with ABC and NBC Sports and at various race tracks in New York and New Jersey. He also called races in California. His signature line — "And down the stretch they come!" — is instantly recognizable throughout the sport, and is often imitated by comedians, notably David Letterman.

From 1972 to 1977, Johnson was the public address announcer for the tracks of the New York Racing Association. In 1977 he moved to the new Meadowlands Racetrack in New Jersey, calling both Thoroughbred and harness racing. He maintained his Meadowlands schedule into the early 21st century.

Johnson called the Kentucky Derby for ABC Sports from 1978 to 1980 and 1987 to 2000, and the Preakness Stakes and Belmont Stakes from 1987 to 2000.

Even though Johnson's Triple Crown TV spot went to Tom Durkin when televising rights shifted from ABC to NBC, he has continued to call the three spring classics for radio, on Premiere Radio Networks and Westwood One. Johnson has also worked on horse racing telecasts for ESPN.

In 2007, Johnson missed calling the Kentucky Derby at Churchill Downs for the first time since 1977, when the rights shifted from Westwood One to ESPN Radio. He was replaced on the broadcast by Churchill's public address announcer, Luke Kruytbosch.

Johnson has also done commercials, both on camera and voice-over, for Mobil Oil and various New York-area businesses. In 2005, 2007, 2008, 2009, and 2010, Johnson made voice appearances on the Late Show with David Letterman on the day prior to the Kentucky Derby, performing a sound bite of his signature phrase "...and down the stretch they come!"

Johnson portrayed himself as the track announcer at Belmont Park in the film Ruffian, about the famous match race in 1975 in which the filly Ruffian broke down as she raced Foolish Pleasure.
