= College Football on NBC Sports =

College football coverage on NBCUniversal properties

- Also known as: Notre Dame Football on NBC/NBCSN/Peacock; Big Ten Saturday on NBC/NBCSN/Peacock; Big Ten Saturday Night; Big Ten Football Night (non-Saturday games)
- Genre: American college football game telecasts
- Directed by: Charlie Dammeyer (evening)
- Presented by: Commentators: Jason Benetti (play-by-play, afternoon); Jason Garrett (color commentator, afternoon); Noah Eagle (play-by-play, evening); Todd Blackledge (color commentator, evening); Reporters: Caroline Pineda (sideline, afternoon); Kathryn Tappen (sideline, evening); Rules analyst: Reggie Smith (afternoon); Terry McAulay (evening); Studio: Ahmed Fareed; John Fanta; Joshua Perry; Chris Simms; Nicole Auerbach (insider) (see more)
- Theme music composer: John Colby (Notre Dame); Alex Hitchens (afternoon); Fall Out Boy (evening)
- Opening theme: “Here Comes Saturday Night” by Fall Out Boy (evening games only)
- Country of origin: United States
- Original language: English
- No. of seasons: 88 (through 2026 season)

Production
- Producer: Matthew Marvin (evening)
- Production locations: Various NCAA stadiums (game telecasts); NBC Sports Headquarters; Stamford, Connecticut (Pre-game, halftime and post-game shows)
- Camera setup: Multi-camera
- Running time: 210 minutes or until game ends (inc. adverts)
- Production companies: National Collegiate Athletic Association; NBC Sports

Original release
- Network: NBC; NBCSN; USA Network; CNBC; Peacock; Telemundo, TeleXitos and Universo (Spanish audio/broadcast)
- Release: September 30, 1939 – present

College Football on NBC Sports is the de facto title used for broadcasts of NCAA college football games produced by NBC Sports for NBC, NBCSN and Peacock.

Via its experimental station W2XBS, NBC presented the first television broadcast of American football at any level on September 30, 1939, between the Fordham Rams and the Waynesburg Yellow Jackets. NBC held rights to the NCAA's regular-season game of the week package from 1952–53, 1955–59, and 1964–65. From 1952 to 1988, NBC was the broadcaster of the Rose Bowl Game. In 1990, NBC first acquired the rights to Notre Dame Fighting Irish home games, as well as the Bayou Classic—agreements that have continued to this day, and have most recently been renewed through 2029 and 2025 respectively.

After Comcast's acquisition of NBC Universal, Versus—later renamed NBC Sports Network (NBCSN)—was merged into the NBC Sports division in 2011. By then, the network's coverage of Division I FBS football (billed as College Football on NBC Sports Network) was limited to a contract with the Mountain West that ended in 2012, and a package of Pac-10 games that had been sub-licensed by the Fox Sports Networks. NBCSN subsequently acquired packages of Division I FCS games from the Colonial Athletic Association (CAA) and Ivy League; both contracts ended in 2017.

From 2015 to 2020, NBCSN broadcast selected Notre Dame home games not televised by NBC. Since 2020, NBC Sports has preferred using Peacock or other NBCUniversal channels (such as USA Network and CNBC) to carry college football games not aired by the main network. The Bayou Classic moved from the NBC broadcast network to NBCSN in 2015, but moved back to NBC in 2022 following the closure of NBCSN in December 2021.

In August 2022, NBC Sports announced that it had acquired a share of the Big Ten's football rights beginning in the 2023 season, which will include Big Ten Saturday Night games in primetime on NBC throughout the season, and a package of games on Peacock branded as Big Ten Saturday. The Big Ten Saturday branding also includes games from the Big Ten Saturday Night package that air in an afternoon window to accommodate Notre Dame primetime games.

== History ==
=== First college football TV broadcast, 1939 ===
On September 30, 1939. NBC broadcast a game between Waynesburg and Fordham on station W2XBS (which would eventually become NBC's flagship station, WNBC) with one camera and Bill Stern as play-by-play announcer. With an estimated audience of 1,000 television sets, it was the first American football game to ever be broadcast via television.

=== 1950s and 1960s: NBC game of the week ===
The first live regular season college football game to be broadcast coast-to-coast by NBC—featuring Duke at Pittsburgh—was broadcast on September 29, 1951. NBC broadcast 17 college football games during the 1951 season.

Under an argument that television broadcasts of football games would be detrimental to in-person attendance, the NCAA voted to prohibit the broadcast of any regular-season college football game without its permission, and establish an exclusive, NCAA-controlled broadcast rights package, consisting of one game per-week. Teams would be limited to one national television appearance per-season. This "game of the week" package was first sold to NBC in 1952 under a one-year contract for $1.144 million. By 1953, the NCAA allowed NBC to add what it called "panorama" coverage of multiple regional broadcasts for certain weeks—shifting national viewers to the most interesting game during its telecast.

After NBC lost its college football contract following the 1953 season, NBC regained college football rights in 1955 and aired games through the 1959 season.

Even after losing the rights to regular season college football in both 1959 and 1965, NBC continued to carry postseason football. NBC carried the Blue–Gray Football Classic, an all-star game, on Christmas Day, until dropping the game in 1963 as a protest of the game's policy of segregation.

NBC regained the NCAA contract for the 1964 and 1965 seasons.

=== 1970s and 1980s: Bowl games ===
NBC consistently served as the Rose Bowl Game's television home from 1952 until 1988 (when it moved to ABC), and added the Sugar Bowl from 1958 to 1969. Other bowl games broadcast by NBC include the Citrus Bowl, Cotton Bowl Classic, Fiesta Bowl, Gator Bowl, Hall of Fame Bowl, Sun Bowl and the Orange Bowl.

=== 1990s and 2000s: Notre Dame football, Bayou Classic ===
In June 1984, the Supreme Court ruled in NCAA v. Board of Regents of University of Oklahoma that the NCAA's broadcast rights policy violated the Sherman Antitrust Act, and that individual universities and athletic conferences were free to sell the broadcast rights to their games. 67 NCAA schools pooled their broadcast rights as part of a group known as the College Football Association (CFA), which negotiated packages with networks on their behalf.

By the late-1980's, the Notre Dame Fighting Irish—which had become one of the most recognizable teams on national television—had grown dissatisfied with the CFA and its contracts, which had an emphasis on regional games. In 1990, the Fighting Irish broke away from the CFA and announced that it would sign a five-year, $38 million contract with NBC to televise its home games beginning in 1991. Analysts felt that given the team's stature, it was inevitable that Notre Dame would eventually choose to negotiate its own television deal. It was also believed that the move would trigger a larger realignment of television rights in college football. This prediction would be realized when the Big East Conference and Southeastern Conference (SEC) also broke away, and signed with CBS Sports beginning in the 1995 season. The CFA eventually shut down in 1997.

Also in the 1991 season, NBC first acquired rights to the Bayou Classic, an annual rivalry game between Grambling State and Southern; the game was considered to be one of the first major, network television broadcasts of a college football game between historically black colleges and universities (HBCUs).

=== 2010s: Addition of NBC Sports Network ===
NBCSN's logo for its college football coverage.

In 2011, Comcast acquired a majority stake in NBC Universal, and merged its existing sports networks—including Versus, which was relaunched as NBC Sports Network (NBCSN) in January 2012—into the NBC Sports division. With the expansion of the Pac-10, Fox Sports decided to move some of its games to FX, while Versus would continue holding rights to seven games each season. The sub-licensing agreement ended in the 2012 season, when the newly-renamed Pac-12 began a new 12-year deal with Fox, ESPN, and the new conference-run Pac-12 Networks.

Ahead of the 2012 season, NBC Sports reached a five-year contract with the Colonial Athletic Association (CAA) to carry basketball and FCS football on its networks; football games would be carried on the Comcast SportsNet networks, with five games per-season airing on NBCSN—marking the first college sports contract reached by the merged division. NBC Sports also renewed its rights to the Ivy League for two additional seasons, with NBCSN carrying at least six to ten football games per-season.

In 2013, NBCSN lost its share of Mountain West rights to ESPN. On April 9, 2013, NBC Sports renewed its broadcasting contract with Notre Dame through the 2025 season. As part of the contract, NBCSN also gained the rights to exclusively broadcast select Notre Dame home games.

In 2014, NBCSN lost a portion of the CAA rights to the American Sports Network, an upstart sports syndication service launched that year by the Sinclair Broadcast Group. NBCSN also initially declined to renew its television deal with the Ivy League, which would have left that league without a television broadcaster for the 2014 season; the channel's increased emphasis on Premier League soccer matches reduced the number of opportunities for the network to carry college football on Saturday afternoons. However, NBCSN reversed its decision and added select Ivy League games beginning in late October 2014 in a joint agreement with Fox College Sports. NBCSN lost its Ivy League rights after the 2017 season as the conference signed an agreement with ESPN the following year, with most games being moved to subscription service ESPN+. The CAA left NBCSN for a one-year deal with CBS Sports Digital and Fox Sports Go in 2018, before signing with FloSports in 2019.

In 2015, the Bayou Classic moved from NBC to NBCSN. In 2020, USA Network exclusively aired one Notre Dame game on September 19, 2020, as overflow for NBC's coverage of the 2020 U.S. Open. A second primetime game was briefly preempted from NBC to USA due to coverage of a speech by president-elect Joe Biden. For the 2021 season, Notre Dame's home opener was aired exclusively on NBCUniversal's new streaming service Peacock. NBCSN shut down at the end of 2021, with its sports properties assumed by Peacock and other NBCUniversal channels.

=== 2020s: Acquisition of Big Ten rights and renewal of Notre Dame rights ===
In 2022, NBC Sports acquired rights to the inaugural HBCU NYC Football Classic game and HBCU Pigskin Showdown all-star game; both events aired on Peacock and CNBC. As part of a contract extension for the Bayou Classic, the game moved back to NBC.

In August 2022, it was reported that NBC Sports, along with CBS and current top rightsholder Fox, were the frontrunners for shares of the Big Ten's next round of media rights beginning in 2023. On August 18, 2022, the Big Ten officially announced that it had reached seven-year deals with Fox, CBS, and NBC to serve as its media partners beginning in the 2023–24 season. NBC will air primetime games throughout the regular season under the title Big Ten Saturday Night. All telecasts will be available on Peacock, while eight Big Ten games per-season (including four intraconference games) will be exclusive to Peacock. NBC was to carry the Big Ten championship game in 2026, while the contract also includes a package of Big Ten basketball games and Olympic sports coverage for Peacock.

On February 2, 2023, NBC announced Noah Eagle, Todd Blackledge, and Kathryn Tappen as the lead broadcast team for Big Ten Saturday Night. Its inaugural game aired on September 2, 2023, featuring the West Virginia Mountaineers at the Penn State Nittany Lions, Blackledge's alma mater. On July 20, NBC announced that Maria Taylor, Joshua Perry, Matt Cassel, Michael Robinson, Ahmed Fareed, and Nicole Auerbach would headline Big Ten College Countdown, which serves as the pre-game and halftime show for Big Ten matchups. The show's name is shortened to College Countdown for Notre Dame games. Following the example of NBC's Sunday Night Football theme performed by Carrie Underwood, the network announced in August 2023 that Fall Out Boy would perform the theme song for Big Ten Saturday Night, a cover of "Here Comes Saturday Night" by Italian band Giuda. To coincide with the new Big Ten package, NBC would adopt new on-air graphics for college football and basketball coverage, replacing a package dating back to 2015 with one influenced by that of Sunday Night Football.

Kickoff begins shortly after 7:30 p.m. Eastern Time to ensure that coverage can conclude in time for affiliates to air a full newscast before NBC’s long-running sketch comedy series Saturday Night Live airs at its traditional 11:30 p.m. start time (a curfew policy dating back to the ill-fated XFL). Since the start of the prime time football package, SNL has been delayed just once, by five minutes.

On November 18, 2023, NBC renewed its rights to Notre Dame football through 2029. NBCSN was revived in November 2025, with its content largely taken from games and events that would have otherwise been exclusive to Peacock.

The dynamics of the Big Ten's media rights have caused some complications for NBC's package: teams have had the right to veto primetime games in November for various logistical reasons, preventing higher-profile teams like Michigan, Ohio State and Penn State from appearing on Big Ten Saturday Night during the final weeks of the regular season. In addition, as the Fox majority-owned Big Ten Network has been considered the de jure rightsholder of the conference's media rights since 2016 (with all media rights agreements having officially been sublicenses of these rights), Big Ten commissioner Tony Petitti learned that the conference would have to compensate Fox for its decision to give NBC a Big Ten championship game in 2026, as the conference did not officially have the authority to do so.

In November 2025, it was reported that NBC was considering sub-licensing its rights to the 2026 championship to a different broadcaster entirely, finding that only having the rights to one Big Ten championship over the course of the contract made it too difficult to monetize. In April 2026, following reports that NBC had considered selling the game to a streaming service, it was reported that it had sold the game back to Fox.

== Current rights ==
- Big Ten Conference
  - Between 14 and 16 Big Ten Saturday Night games on NBC
  - 8 games on NBCSN/Peacock
- University of Notre Dame
  - Rights to all home games on NBC
  - One game per-season on NBCSN/Peacock
- HBCU
  - Bayou Classic on NBC
  - HBCU Pigskin Showdown all-star game on CNBC and Peacock

== On-air talent ==
=== On-site ===
Play-by-play

- Jason Benetti: lead Notre Dame, alternate Big Ten
- Noah Eagle: lead Big Ten, Notre Dame
- Chris Lewis: lead HBCU
- Paul Burmeister: alternate Big Ten and Notre Dame
- Dave Flemming: alternate Big Ten

Analysts

- Todd Blackledge: lead Big Ten, Notre Dame
- Jason Garrett: lead Notre Dame, alternate Big Ten
- Anthony Herron: lead HBCU
- Charles Arbuckle: alternate HBCU
- Yogi Roth: secondary Big Ten
- Matt Cassel: alternate Big Ten
- Ian Book: alternate Big Ten

Sideline reporters

- Kathryn Tappen: lead Big Ten, Notre Dame
- Caroline Pineda: lead Notre Dame, alternate Big Ten
- Corey Robinson: lead HBCU
- Lewis Johnson: alternate HBCU, Big Ten
- Ashley ShahAhmadi: alternate Big Ten
- Zora Stephenson: alternate Big Ten
- Tamara Brown: alternate HBCU

Rules analysts

- Terry McAulay: lead Big Ten, Notre Dame evening
- Reggie Smith: lead Notre Dame afternoon, alternate Big Ten

=== Studio ===
Hosts

- Ahmed Fareed
- John Fanta

Analysts

- Joshua Perry
- Chris Simms

Insider

- Nicole Auerbach

Game breaks

- John Fanta

== See also ==
- College football on television
