= Notre Dame Football on NBC =

US television program

- Former logo used from 2017 to 2023
- Also known as: Notre Dame Football on NBCSN/Peacock
- Genre: American college football game telecasts
- Directed by: Charlie Dammeyer (evening)
- Presented by: Commentators: Jason Benetti (play-by-play, afternoon); Jason Garrett (color commentator, afternoon); Noah Eagle (play-by-play, evening); Todd Blackledge (color commentator, evening); Reporters: Caroline Pineda (sideline, afternoon); Kathryn Tappen (sideline, evening); Rules analyst: Reggie Smith (afternoon); Terry McAulay (evening); Studio: Ahmed Fareed; John Fanta; Joshua Perry; Chris Simms; Nicole Auerbach (insider)
- Theme music composer: John Colby
- Opening theme: “Here Comes Saturday Night” by Fall Out Boy (evening games only)
- Country of origin: United States
- Original language: English
- No. of seasons: 36 (through 2026 season)
- No. of episodes: 243

Production
- Producer: Matthew Marvin (evening)
- Production locations: Notre Dame Stadium; Notre Dame, Indiana, U.S. (Regular season); Various NCAA stadiums (Shamrock Series); NBC Sports Headquarters; Stamford, Connecticut (Pre-game, halftime and post-game shows)
- Camera setup: Multi-camera
- Running time: 210 minutes or until game ends (inc. adverts)
- Production companies: National Collegiate Athletic Association; NBC Sports

Original release
- Network: NBC; NBCSN; Peacock; Telemundo, TeleXitos and Universo (Spanish audio/broadcast)
- Release: September 7, 1991 – present

Related
- College Football on NBC Sports

Notre Dame Football on NBC is an American presentation of college football games involving the Notre Dame Fighting Irish that are produced by NBC Sports, the sports division of the NBC television network in the United States. NBC Sports has broadcast all regular season Notre Dame home games since September 7, 1991.

Since NBC began airing Notre Dame home football games 35 years ago, NBC's deal with the university has ensured that all of its home games are on national broadcast television, a unique configuration among American sports. Most of the games are televised in the afternoon, usually starting at 3:30 p.m. ET. The rest are televised in primetime, usually starting at 7:30 p.m. ET.

The network's affiliate in South Bend, Gray Media-owned WNDU-TV (channel 16) also produces and airs its own pregame show, Countdown to Kickoff, which airs either prior to a home game broadcast on NBC or before the start of the NBC Sports schedule on game day.

Since 2011, at least two games per season are played in prime time, often played at neutral venues for the purposes of recruiting, tourism and financial benefits for playing at those sites, a high profile matchup involving a major opponent, or to schedule around conflicts with other NBC Sports or NBC News programming. Since 2021, one game per season has aired on NBC's over-the-top streaming service Peacock. Previously, these games aired on an NBCUniversal-owned cable channel, such as USA Network.

== History ==
=== Prior to NBC ===
The first Notre Dame football telecast occurred on November 19, 1949, when WTVN-TV (now WSYX) in Columbus, Ohio broadcast Notre Dame's game against the Iowa Hawkeyes.

Notre Dame soon had an exclusive television deal with the DuMont Television Network starting in 1950. What attracted Notre Dame to DuMont despite receiving higher bids from ABC and NBC was DuMont's willingness to air educational programs on behalf of Notre Dame along with the football broadcast. This triggered concern from NCAA members that television would hurt attendance. However, Notre Dame argued that the contract with DuMont actually increased interest in their football program and the university.

On October 1, 1950, WSB-TV in Atlanta, Georgia broadcast Notre Dame's game against the North Carolina Tar Heels from Notre Dame, Indiana via a coaxial cable. WBKB-TV in nearby Chicago aired Notre Dame's home games live with the aid of a microwave relay system that was fashioned by William C. "Bill" Eddy, Bill Kusack, and Arch Brolly.

Through the next three years, Notre Dame's games were mostly edited and syndicated for airing on Saturday nights. The telecasts were typically condensed to a one-hour program anchored by Lindsey Nelson.

Notre Dame next landed a television deal with ABC in 1953. It was ABC who would air the "Game of the Century" between Notre Dame and the Michigan State Spartans on November 19, 1966. The game was not shown live on national TV. The agreement between the NCAA and ABC in effect at the time limited each team to one national television appearance and two regional television appearances each season. Notre Dame had used their national TV slot in the season opening game against Purdue. ABC executives did not even want to show the game anywhere except the immediate region, but pressure from the West Coast and the South (to the tune of 50,000 letters) made ABC air the game on tape delay.

In 1976, Notre Dame was one of 67 schools to form the College Football Association (CFA) and pool their television rights. However, by the second half of the 1980s, Notre Dame had become one of the most valuable and recognizable teams on national television and was unhappy with deals signed by the CFA that emphasized regional games.

In 1986, Notre Dame joined eight independent schools in the East coast in a secondary rights deal with Jefferson-Pilot Communications. In the event that CBS or ESPN passed on airing that week's Notre Dame game, Jefferson-Pilot's independent stations could broadcast it throughout the country. CBS most notably broadcast the famous "Catholics vs. Convicts" game against the Miami Hurricanes in 1988.

=== 1990s ===
In February 1990, Notre Dame broke away from the CFA and signed a five-year broadcasting contract with NBC beginning with the 1991 season, worth $38 million. The deal surprised the college football world and left many of the other CFA members unhappy with Notre Dame. Notre Dame earned half of the $7.6 million that NBC paid for the rights each year of the deal and its opponent received the other half. The last regular season Notre Dame home game to be televised on a network outside of NBC was on November 17, 1990, when the Irish played their final home game of the season against Penn State in a game that was broadcast by ESPN. (Note: Starting in 2024, with the expansion of the College Football Playoff, Notre Dame home playoff games are permitted to be televised by other networks who serve as media rights holders for the playoff. The first such instance occurred on December 20, 2024 when Notre Dame hosted Indiana in a first-round playoff game televised on ABC and ESPN.)

The network's 1993 broadcast of the Game of the Century between Florida State Seminoles and Notre Dame (ranked as the #1 and #2 college football teams at the time) is still the most-watched regular season college football game since NBC began carrying the Fighting Irish's games.

=== 2000s ===
The 2005 "Bush Push" game between Notre Dame and USC in Indiana on NBC was the most watched college football game across all networks in nine years.

In 2009, Notre Dame began to play one home game each year at a neutral site outside of the university's Notre Dame, Indiana campus for recruitment and exposure purposes; these are broadcast nationally on NBC as part of the television deal with 7:30 p.m. Eastern start times under the banner of the Shamrock Series. This was initiated with a late October 2009 game against Washington State at the Alamodome in San Antonio. A November 2010 matchup against Army at Yankee Stadium, which NBC also televised, was also a Notre Dame home game, despite West Point's proximity to the Tri-State area. Notre Dame battled Miami at Soldier Field in 2012 and met Arizona State at Cowboys Stadium in Arlington, Texas in 2013. A year later Notre Dame played Purdue at Lucas Oil Stadium, and in 2015 Notre Dame played against Boston College at Fenway Park. As of 2026, the Irish have never lost under the Shamrock Series banner.

=== 2010s ===
Ratings for NBC's Notre Dame game telecasts slumped to historic lows during the 2011 season, coinciding with average performances of the team on the football field over the past several years. However, the resurgence in the program under Brian Kelly in 2012 resulted in the network's highest game viewership since 2005.

In 2011, sister channel Versus (later NBCSN) began airing rebroadcasts of past Notre Dame games, including those aired on NBC over the years. Previously via NBC's rights deal, sister cable network Universal HD aired same-week reruns of Notre Dame home games until NBCUniversal's January 2011 merger with Comcast. The deal had also been expanded to cover some games of the university's hockey team. Furthermore, when numerous weather delays forced a Notre Dame football game against the University of South Florida to go past the alotted time period, NBC never rejoined the game, opting instead to air a movie. Versus picked up the conclusion of the game.

On April 9, 2013, NBC Sports renewed its broadcasting contract with Notre Dame for ten years through the 2025 season. Double the length of prior contract extension deals, the agreement allowed NBC Sports the rights to a minimum of seven home games to be broadcast per season, with NBC Sports Network also acquiring rights to select games beginning in 2016. While most games traditionally were held at 3:30 p.m. Eastern on Saturdays, some games were played during primetime. Revenue from the deal, worth around $15M annually, continued to aid non-athlete student financial assistance.

On November 21, 2015, NBCSN broadcast its first live Notre Dame game, a neutral site night game against Boston College held at Boston's Fenway Park as part of the Shamrock Series.

On September 8, 2016, NBC announced that all Notre Dame home games during the 2016 season would be broadcast in 4K ultra-high-definition television exclusively on DirecTV.

On September 30, 2017, NBCSN broadcast its second live Notre Dame game against Miami (OH).

For Notre Dame's November 23, 2019, senior day game against Boston College, the school's broadcasting arm Fighting Irish Media produced an alternate broadcast for NBCSN known as the "Notre Dame Fan Feed", which carried the team radio broadcast with Paul Burmeister and Ryan Harris, segments featuring a studio panel hosted by Ahmed Fareed, Jessica Smetana, Darius Walker, and Daelin Hayes, and on-field reports by Tony Simeone that highlighted Notre Dame traditions and fans.

=== 2020s ===
Notre Dame's September 19, 2020, game against South Florida was moved to USA Network due to conflicts with the 2020 U.S. Open on NBC. With NBC's usual production unit working the U.S. Open, the broadcast was produced using the university's in-house Notre Dame Studios and Fighting Irish Media unit (in combination with NBC talent, and staff working from NBC Sports' Stamford, Connecticut studios), marking the first time it had worked a regular season Fighting Irish football game on NBC.

Notre Dame's double-overtime win against Clemson on November 7, 2020 was NBC's most-watched Notre Dame game since 2005, averaging just over 10 million viewers. This was despite part of the game being pre-empted to USA Network due to coverage of a primetime address by Joe Biden, winner of the 2020 United States presidential election.

On August 4, 2021, NBC announced that the team's 2021 home opener against Toledo would be exclusive to paid subscribers of NBCUniversal's streaming service Peacock, the first Notre Dame home game not to air on terrestrial television since 1990 vs. Air Force.

For Notre Dame's September 23, 2023, primetime game against Big Ten team Ohio State, NBC utilized its Big Ten Saturday Night broadcast team of Noah Eagle, Todd Blackledge, and Kathryn Tappen rather than its usual Notre Dame broadcast team of Jac Collinsworth, Jason Garrett, and Zora Stephenson (who were instead assigned to an afternoon Big Ten game).

On November 18, 2023, NBC renewed its rights to the Fighting Irish through 2029, worth approximately $50 million a year. NBC will continue to carry most Notre Dame home games, with one game per-season being exclusive to Peacock. Notre Dame Studios will also produce a documentary series following the team for Peacock.

On December 20, 2024, Notre Dame played its first home game not aired by NBC since 1990 for the first round of the 2024 College Football Playoff against the Indiana Hoosiers; the game was televised by ABC as part of ESPN's exclusive rights to the CFP.

== Personalities ==
=== Current ===
==== Game coverage ====
- Jason Benetti – lead play-by-play (2026–present)
- Noah Eagle – #2 lead play-by-play (2023–present)
- Paul Burmeister – fill-in play-by-play (2017, 2020, 2023–present)
- Jason Garrett – lead color commentator (2022–present)
- Todd Blackledge – #2 lead color commentator (2023–present)
- Caroline Pineda – lead sideline reporter (2026–present)
- Kathryn Tappen – #2 lead sideline reporter (2014–present)
- Terry McAulay – rules analyst (2018–present)
- Reggie Smith – rules analyst (2023–present)

==== Studio coverage ====
- Ahmed Fareed – studio host (2023–present)
- John Fanta – game break/alternate studio host (2025–present)
- Joshua Perry – studio analyst (2023–present)
- Chris Simms – studio analyst (2024–present)
- Nicole Auerbach – insider (2023–present)

=== Former ===
==== Play-by-play ====
- Jac Collinsworth (2022–2023)
- Don Criqui (1994–1997)
- Dick Enberg (1991, 1993 and 1998–1999)
- Tom Hammond (1992–1997 and 2000–2015)
- Dan Hicks (2002, 2011–2016 and 2024–2026)
- Charlie Jones (1993–1997)
- Craig Minervini (2000)
- Mike Tirico (2016–2021)

==== Color commentary ====
- Drew Brees (2021)
- Todd Christensen (1993)
- Cris Collinsworth (1992–1994)
- Randy Cross (1994–1996)
- Tony Dungy (2020)
- Doug Flutie (2014–2019)
- Pat Haden (1998–2009)
- Paul Maguire (1995)
- Mike Mayock (2010–2014)
- Colt McCoy (2024)
- Beasley Reece (1996)
- Joe Theismann (2009)
- Bob Trumpy (1993 and 1995–1997)
- Bill Walsh (1991)

==== Sideline reporters ====
- Jac Collinsworth (2020)
- John Dockery (1991–1997)
- Alex Flanagan (2007–2013)
- Jim Gray (1998–2001)
- Lewis Johnson (2002–2006)
- O. J. Simpson (1991–1993)
- Zora Stephenson (2022–2025)

==== Studio hosts ====
- Jac Collinsworth (2020–2021)
- Jordan Cornette (2024–2025)
- Bob Costas (1993)
- Liam McHugh (2013–2019)
- Maria Taylor (2023–2024)

==== Studio analysts ====
- Dhani Jones (2016)
- Jonathan Vilma (2015)
- Chris Simms (2017–2019)
- Hines Ward (2013–2015)
- Doug Flutie (2020)
- Corey Robinson (2021)
- Matt Cassel (2023–2025)
- Michael Robinson (2023–2025)
