= NBCSN =

American sports television channel

- Country: United States
- Broadcast area: Nationwide
- Headquarters: Stamford, Connecticut

Programming
- Language: English
- Picture format: 1080i HDTV (downscaled to letterboxed 480i for the SDTV feed)

Ownership
- Owner: NBCUniversal (Comcast)
- Parent: NBC Sports Group
- Sister channels: NBC; NBC Sports NOW; NBC Sports Regional Networks; Peacock; Telemundo; TeleXitos; Universo

History
- Launched: July 31, 1995; 31 years ago (original); November 17, 2025; 12 months ago (relaunch)
- Closed: December 31, 2021; 4 years ago (original)
- Former names: Outdoor Life Network (1995–2006); Versus (2006–2011)

Links
- Website: nbcsports.com

NBCSN (also known as NBC Sports Network) is an American sports television channel owned by the NBC Sports Group division of NBCUniversal, a subsidiary of Comcast.

It originally launched on July 31, 1995, as the Outdoor Life Network (OLN), which was dedicated to programming primarily involving fishing, hunting, outdoor adventure programs and outdoor sports. By the turn of the 21st century, OLN became better known for its extensive coverage of the Tour de France but eventually began covering more "mainstream" sporting events, resulting in its relaunch as Versus on September 25, 2006.

In 2011, Comcast, the original owner of the network, acquired a majority stake in NBCUniversal. As a result, Comcast merged the operations of its pay channels with those of NBC. In particular, it aligned the operation of its sports channels with NBC's sports division, NBC Sports. On January 1, 2012, Versus was rebranded as the NBC Sports Network. The branding was later shortened to NBCSN. By September 15, 2014, most of NBC Sports' operations, including NBCSN, had moved to facilities in Stamford, Connecticut.

As of February 2020, NBCSN was distributed to 79.879 million homes and was the second most watched cable sports network besides ESPN (though some sources included ESPN2 as a separate network in those figures). On January 22, 2021, after its rights to the NHL were transferred to ESPN/ABC and TNT, NBCUniversal announced that the network would shut down by the end of the year. NBCSN closed on December 31, 2021, with its sports properties moved to Peacock, USA Network and other NBCUniversal networks.

On October 2, 2025, as part of a new carriage agreement with YouTube TV, NBCUniversal announced that it would launch a second incarnation of NBCSN, with its launch date later confirmed for November 17, 2025. The new iteration of the channel is designed to be a linear television outlet for NBC Sports after the upcoming spin-off of NBCUniversal's other cable networks (including USA Network) as Versant, primarily carrying content that was previously exclusive to Peacock (although certain sports properties will remain exclusive to the streaming platform).

== History ==
=== 1990s: the Outdoor Life Network ===
The channel originally launched as the Outdoor Life Network (or OLN) on July 31, 1995; the name was licensed from Outdoor Life magazine. Its programming consisted of hunting, fishing, and outdoor adventure shows. In its early days, the channel reached around one million homes and found most of its carriage via the then-infant platforms of direct broadcast satellite services and digital cable. The network was one of two (the other being Speedvision) formed out of a partnership of Cox Cable and Times Mirror which had combined their cable systems operations a year earlier. Outdoor Life was originally planned to have launched at the beginning of July 1995. However, it was delayed when Times Mirror decided to reassess its media holdings. Times Mirror decided to reduce its stake in the two new networks to 10%; bringing Comcast and Continental Cablevision on as partners. The network initially had trouble gaining carriage and was also broadcast on several low power television stations. In 1998, the Fox Entertainment Group (then a subsidiary of News Corporation) purchased a 30% ownership interest in OLN (along with sister channel Speedvision). In May 2001, Comcast acquired Fox's 30% stake in OLN, along with Golf Channel.

In 1999, OLN acquired the U.S. broadcast rights to the Tour de France for US$3 million. Coverage of the Tour on OLN brought substantially greater viewership to the then-fledgling channel, due in part to the then-growing popularity of American rider Lance Armstrong. In 2004, where Armstrong would aim for a record-breaking sixth straight Tour de France title, OLN would devote over 344 hours in July to coverage of the Tour, along with documentaries and other original programming surrounding the event, all of which were promoted through a $20 million advertising campaign.

Overall, while its coverage of the Tour de France helped OLN expand its carriage to over 60 million homes, rumors surrounding Armstrong's possible retirement from cycling led to concerns over the channel's overemphasis on him in its coverage (to the point that some critics sarcastically referred to OLN as the "Only Lance Network"). Critics questioned whether the network could sustain itself without the viewership that Lance Armstrong's presence had brought to its coverage.

Following the 2005 Tour (where Armstrong captured his seventh victory in the race, and announced his retirement from cycling afterward), OLN debuted a new lineup of programming led by the acquisition of off-network reruns of the reality competition series Survivor. OLN's executives believed that airing reruns of Survivor would fit well with the new direction it had planned for OLN, and could attract viewership from fans of the show who had watched it on CBS, though it was also the first example to prove that traditional repeats of reality competitions with the results already known were an unviable strategy.

Around the same period, OLN also acquired the rights to the Dakar Rally, America's Cup, the Boston Marathon, and the Iditarod. OLN planned to cover these events in a similar style to how it covered the Tour, hoping that its coverage might bring "surprise" results for the channel. Due in part to Armstrong's absence from the Tour in 2006, its ratings for live coverage of the first four stages of the race drew 49% fewer viewers than previous years.

=== 2000s: the NHL and relaunch as Versus ===
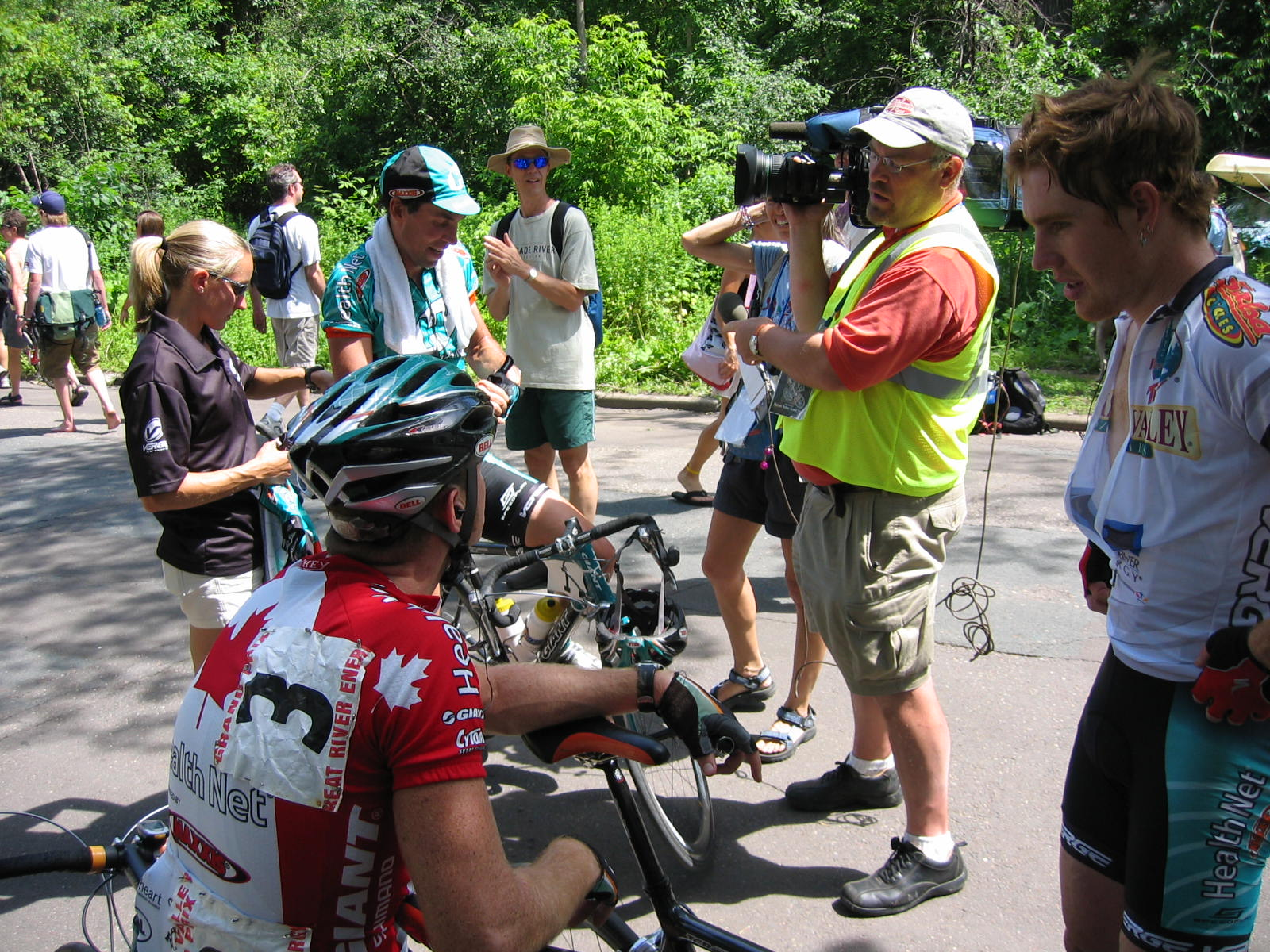
OLN interview with John Lieswyn after he won the Stillwater, Minnesota, Criterion in 2005

In May 2005, ESPN rejected a $60 million offer to renew its broadcasting contract with the National Hockey League (NHL) into the 2005–06 season, and the league rejected its alternate proposal for a revenue sharing agreement similar to the one it had established with NBC. With the NFL also shopping a new late-season package of Thursday and Saturday night games to potential broadcasters, speculation began to emerge that Comcast would bid on the new NHL contract as its first step to transforming OLN into a mainstream sports channel that could compete with ESPN. Comcast had already been involved in NHL broadcasting; at the time, it owned majority control of the Philadelphia Flyers, and four Comcast SportsNet regional sports networks.

In August 2005, ESPN declined to match Comcast's offer, and OLN acquired pay television rights to the NHL beginning in the 2005–2006 season in a three-year deal worth close to $200 million. The new deal would include 58 regular season games on Monday and Tuesday nights, coverage of the NHL All-Star Game, conference finals, and the first two games of the Stanley Cup Final. With the help of its new NHL package, by June 2006, OLN had now reached 75 million subscribers. However, due in part to OLN's lesser carriage in comparison to ESPN, the NHL's ratings that season had suffered in comparison.

In 2006, OLN broadcast selected games in the Arena Football League's 2006 season. The channel televised a weekly regular-season game for 11 weeks as well as a wild card playoff game. However, the agreement was not renewed and was later acquired by ESPN, who also acquired a minority stake in the league's ownership.

Versus logo used from 2006 to 2011

In April 2006, Comcast announced that it would be renaming Outdoor Life Network to Versus in the fall of 2006. As the network had shifted beyond simply "outdoor" programming, the name "Versus" was intended to represent the common element of competition within its lineup. OLN's relaunch as Versus occurred on September 25, 2006.

Among the new programming acquired by Versus was a number of combat sports, beginning with a series of boxing programs promoted by Bob Arum's Top Rank promotion. The channel also began televising Chuck Norris's World Combat League, a kickboxing promotion featuring a unique round ring without ropes. Versus entered into a partnership with World Extreme Cagefighting (WEC) to bring mixed martial arts events to the channel, with the first being broadcast live on June 3, 2007.

The channel also added a variety of sports events as part of the rebranding, including men's and women's college basketball, high school basketball, a weekly "game of the week" for the National Lacrosse League, darts competitions, the Major Indoor Soccer League, and the USA Sevens, one of the nine tournaments (then eight) that make up the IRB Sevens World Series, the top annual circuit in the sevens version of rugby union.

In 2007, Versus expanded its college football coverage; the network acquired a portion of the rights to the Mountain West Conference (as part of the deal, Comcast also took a stake in the conference's new cable network MountainWest Sports Network), and acquired a package of 10 Big 12 and Pac-10 football games sublicensed from Fox Sports Net (replacing a package it had previously sub-licensed to TBS).

In 2008, Versus announced a contract with the Ivy League to broadcast at least three games each year beginning in the 2008 season, culminating with the annual Harvard–Yale rivalry game. The initial two-year contract was later renewed in 2010.

Versus acquired coverage for the 2007 America's Cup, which had been a staple on ESPN and ESPN2 for years. The channel began to show qualifying regattas in late 2005, aired the Louis Vuitton Cup for challengers in 2007, and the America's Cup match between the Louis Vuitton winner and current champions, won by Alinghi of Switzerland in Valencia, Spain. In 2006, it acquired the American broadcast rights (in conjunction with The Tennis Channel) of Davis Cup events.

Versus, with NBC Sports and the World Championship Sports Network (later Universal Sports), broadcast coverage of the 2007 World Championships in Athletics from Osaka, Japan, as well as the 2009 World Championships in Athletics from Berlin, Germany.

On January 28, 2008, Versus and the NHL extended their television contract through the 2010–11 season. In June 2008, operations were moved from Stamford, Connecticut, to Comcast's headquarters in Philadelphia, Pennsylvania. On August 7, 2008, the channel announced a 10-year deal with the Indy Racing League to broadcast at least 13 IndyCar Series events a year in HD, beginning in 2009. The channel would also broadcast various motorsports series on its Lucas Oil Motorsports Hour program such as USAC, the Lucas Oil Late Model Dirt Series, and World Series of Off-Road Racing.

The channel aired the 96th Grey Cup, the championship game of the Canadian Football League in 2008.

On April 5, 2010, Versus debuted The Daily Line, a sports betting show consisting of a four-person panel (host Liam McHugh before moving to NBC Sports, handicapper Rob DeAngelis, comedian Reese Waters, and Jenn Sterger) who discussed, often with heavy satire, sports-related topics that were popular that day. However, the show was cancelled due to low viewership on November 4, 2010. It was revived by NBC Sports Radio in 2019 after the PASPA Act was declared unconstitutional, though NBCSN instead blended betting content into regular programming.

The Ultimate Fighting Championship would air two live events on the channel due to the new contract agreement with UFC sister promotion World Extreme Cagefighting. The first edition of UFC on Versus aired on March 21, 2010, headlined by Brandon Vera vs. Jon Jones in the Light Heavyweight division. The second event aired on August 1 with Jon Jones facing Vladimir Matyushenko. Also, as part of the agreement with the UFC, several UFC Countdown shows would air. A countdown show aired the week of a pay-per-view event, usually lasting for one hour, and covering 2–3 of the biggest fights on the card. In August 2011, the UFC announced a new broadcasting deal with the channels of rival Fox Sports, which would begin to take effect in November 2011.

Versus had also struck a deal with the NBA to air 10 regular-season NBA Development League Saturday night games, as well as six playoff games a year. In total, the channel would air 16 NBA Development League games, in addition to 25 hours of NBA specials.

Starting in August 2010, Versus aired nine races of the NASCAR Whelen Modified Tour and NASCAR Whelen Southern Modified Tour each Wednesday at 7 p.m. The races originated from a variety of locations, including Stafford Motor Speedway, Tri-County Speedway, and Thompson Motor Speedway.

=== 2010s: Merger with NBC Sports and new names ===
In February 2011, Comcast acquired a majority stake in NBC Universal, and merged its content operations into the company. As part of the acquisition, Versus and Comcast's other sports channels began to be integrated into the NBC Sports division. Coinciding with the merger, President Jamie Davis was replaced by Comcast Sports Group president Jon Litner. Litner began to oversee the channel, in addition to his other duties, following the Comcast takeover.

In March 2011, Versus expanded its college football coverage by becoming the pay television partner for NBC's coverage of Notre Dame football, airing replays of Notre Dame games, and the first-ever live broadcast of the team's annual spring game. Its coverage began with a marathon of three classic Fighting Irish games on March 17, St. Patrick's Day, to serve as a prelude to its coverage of the spring game.

For the 2011 season, Versus also returned to airing National Lacrosse League telecasts with a nine-game package, starting with the 2011 All-Star Game and culminating with the Champion's Cup final. Versus would remove the NLL coverage for the league's 2012 season; U.S. broadcast rights were instead acquired by CBS Sports Network.

Logo using the full "NBC Sports Network" name, used from 2012 to just before the 2014 Winter Olympics

In April 2011, NBC Sports and Versus announced they had reached a ten-year extension to their television contract with the National Hockey League worth nearly $2 billion over the life of the contract. As part of the announcement, Dick Ebersol, the former chairman of NBC Sports, said that Versus would be renamed "within 90 days" in order to reflect the synergy resulting from the merger. However, the announcement of a new name did not come until August 1, 2011, when Comcast announced that Versus would be relaunched as the NBC Sports Network (NBCSN) on January 1, 2012. The relaunch coincided with NBC's coverage of the NHL Winter Classic, which occurred on the same day.

In an interview with TV Guide, president of programming Jon Miller stated that NBCSN was to be positioned as a credible "full-service sports network", removing low-brow programming (such as Whacked Out Sports and The T.Ocho Show) in favor of focusing on event coverage, and sports news and talk programs, including new original programming. NBC also made efforts to expand its current broadcasting relationships and acquire new rights for additional sports events to be broadcast on the channel. In the months leading up to the relaunch, NBC struck deals with Major League Soccer, removed the UFL, and added coverage of college hockey games.

On June 6, 2011, it was revealed that NBC Sports would extend its rights to the Olympic Games through 2020, outbidding competing bids by Fox Sports and ESPN in a $4.38 billion contract. The network began to participate in NBC's overall coverage beginning at the 2012 Summer Olympics. Its coverage of the women's soccer gold medal match between the United States and Japan set a new viewership record for the network, with 4.35 million viewers.

In August 2013, after having largely been used as an initialism in unofficial capacities, the channel officially shortened its name to NBCSN. The change was made to help streamline its branding in preparation for the 2014 Winter Olympics, by which time the name change was mostly complete.

On September 22, 2013, NBCSN broadcast an episode of Under Wild Skies, a hunting program aired as a time-buy by the National Rifle Association of America (NRA), in which host and NRA lobbyist Tony Makris was shown killing an African elephant on a trip to Botswana. The network was criticized by the media for airing such material; while NBC responded by pulling the episode due to its "objectionable" content and stating that it would be more "aggressive" towards the content of future episodes of the program. Under Wild Skies was pulled from the network entirely after Makris made remarks on an NRA-produced webcast comparing critics of the show to Hitler. The network's outdoors block, its final connection with its OLN era, was discontinued by 2016 with natural contract expirations, as the outdoor networks of Kroenke Sports & Entertainment effectively monopolized the market through their own three networks, along with streaming providers. The editorial standards for those venues also had more tolerance for the firearms-centric genre (and advertiser base) of outdoors programming.

NBCSN simulcast Spanish-language coverage of two matches from the 2018 FIFA World Cup from corporate sibling Telemundo: Brazil vs. Switzerland on June 17, and England vs. Belgium on June 28.

In December 2018, the yearly ratings rankings for American sports networks saw NBCSN rank second for the first time, ahead of ESPN2, which fell below the second spot for the first time in its history.

Because of Comcast's acquisition of Sky plc, NBCSN partnered with the British media firm's Sky Sports division on coverage of international events. The first collaboration came at the Premier League transfer deadline in January 2019. Two months later, NBCSN added an hour-long simulcast of the Sky Sports News channel to its weekday morning lineup, returning that program to American television for the first time since the discontinuation of Fox Soccer in September 2013.

=== 2021 closure ===
Last logo used during original run

On January 22, 2021, an internal memo sent by NBC Sports president Pete Bevacqua announced that the network would close by the end of the year, and that USA Network and NBC would begin airing more NBC Sports programming, including the Stanley Cup Playoffs, IndyCar Series, and NASCAR Cup Series, before NBCSN's shutdown (NBC's rights to the NHL had expired and transferred to an ESPN/Turner Sports consortium after the 2020–2021 season).

When NBCSN was shuttered, its programming was effectively merged into USA Network's schedule, with some events also moving to CNBC on weekends, freeing NBC Sports from the burden of having secondary programming to fill time without any live sporting events. Peacock, NBCUniversal's new streaming service, began to broadcast some of the network's former programming such as Notre Dame hockey, and would also simulcast several major sports events held by NBCSN as a transitional move, most notably the opening games of the 2021 Stanley Cup Final.

The move was cited by industry analysts as a response to the impact of the COVID-19 pandemic on the sports and television industries, the acceleration of cord-cutting, as well as formidable competition from rival sports networks such as ESPN and Fox Sports 1, noting the company saw an overall revenue decline by 19% to $6.72 billion.

Following a gradual discontinuation of operations (even further aggravated by NBC of NHL rights being expired), it was further disclosed as to the process of how NBCSN would shut down on November 2, 2021; specifically, it was revealed on that date that a majority of NBCSN's sports rights, beginning with rights to Premier League soccer, would transfer over to USA Network, the Olympic Channel (which itself shut down nine months after NBCSN did) and Peacock, beginning at 12:00:01 a.m. on January 1, 2022; at that time, the network, after signing off, would then carry a looping advisory video advising viewers where its programs could be found until January 10, though the provider could replace or remove the channel feed immediately after sign-off. NBC also advised viewers during broadcasts of affected games as to their new location, along with making sure electronic program guide listings reflected the channel's closure, and the company's social media was used to advise viewers as well. Mecum Auctions already had a secondary content deal with Motor Trend and a tertiary deal with RFD-TV; Motor Trend became its primary television partner at the start of 2022, and later moved to ESPN+.

The Canadian iteration of the former OLN was relaunched under another NBCUniversal brand, Bravo, on September 1, 2024.

=== 2025–present: Revival ===
In July 2025, The Wall Street Journal reported that NBCUniversal was considering relaunching a linear television sports channel. The new channel was proposed as carrying Peacock-exclusive sports broadcasts, and was expected to be positioned as a premium channel exclusive to "specific cable packages" rather than a widely distributed network so as not to cannibalize Peacock. The new channel came amid Comcast's plans to spin-off of most of NBCUniversal's cable networks (including USA Network) as the new company Versant in 2026. On October 2, 2025, NBCUniversal announced a new long-term carriage agreement with YouTube TV, which indirectly announced that a new incarnation of NBCSN would be covered under the agreement.

NBC Sports president Rick Cordella explained that one of the motivations for the channel was a discussion with YouTube CBO Mary Ellen Coe, where they contemplated the possibility of YouTube TV sublicensing Peacock's sports content as part of its next carriage agreement with NBCUniversal. Efforts to allow YouTube TV to "ingest" streaming content such as sports into its service and user experience had been a sticking point in recent carriage negotiations involving broadcasters such as NBCUniversal. Cordella asked, "if we're able to amortize the cost of our content, and we became agnostic to how people consumed it, whether it be through the traditional pay TV ecosystem or through Peacock and DTC, as long as we're getting paid appropriately for it, why would we care [how it's distributed]?" While admitting that it was "crazy" to launch a new cable channel in 2025 amid the decline of the industry in favor of streaming, he added that live sports were still a prominent draw on subscription television.

The relaunch of NBCSN is also intended to provide NBC Sports with a linear television outlet for its sports properties after the Versant spin-off, as Bravo became its only remaining English-language cable network. While some NBC Sports properties will continue to have a presence on both Peacock/NBCSN and USA Network as part of sublicensing agreements or joint contracts with Versant (including the Olympics, Premier League, and golf), Versant established an USA Sports division that will acquire its own sports rights in competition with NBC Sports (including agreements with LOVB Pro and the Pac-12 Conference among others), and also assumed ownership of selected NBC Sports properties such as Atlantic 10 Conference basketball and NASCAR.

The revived NBCSN officially launched on November 17 through YouTube TV, and was added to Comcast-owned Xfinity on November 25. As was previously rumored, it largely draws from existing programming produced and/or announced for NBC Sports on Peacock, with studio shows such as The Dan Patrick Show, PFT Live (which had both moved from the original NBCSN to Peacock), and The Dan Le Batard Show, and live sporting events including the NBA and WNBA, Major League Baseball, college sports, the Premier League, Olympic sports, and the Gold Zone whiparound show beginning at the 2026 Winter Olympics among others. The channel will not carry all of Peacock's sports broadcasts, with properties such as NFL games remaining exclusive to the service.

NBCSN was added to FuboTV in June 2026.

== Facilities ==
By September 15, 2014, the entirety of NBC Sports' operations, including NBCSN, moved to a new campus in Stamford, Connecticut.

Football Night in America remained at NBC Studios in Rockefeller Center until September 7, 2014, when that program also moved to Stamford.

== Notable personalities ==
=== Announcers, reporters and hosts ===
- Bob Costas: Sunday Night Baseball host (2026-present); host (2006–2019)
- Rebecca Lowe: studio host for Premier League, studio host (2013–2021; 2026-present)
- Maria Taylor: NBA on NBC/WNBA on NBC studio host (2025–present)
- Ahmed Fareed: NBA on NBC, Sunday Night Baseball, and college football studio host (2025–present)

=== NBA ===
- Mike Tirico: lead play-by-play (2025–present)
- Noah Eagle: play-by-play (2025–present)
- Terry Gannon: play-by-play (2025–present)
- Michael Grady: play-by-play (2025–present)
- Mark Followill: play-by-play (2025–present)
- Jason Benetti: play-by-play (2026-present)
- Reggie Miller: co-lead color commentator (2025–present)
- Jamal Crawford: co-lead color commentator/rotating studio analyst (2025–present)
- Grant Hill: color commentator (2025–present)
- Austin Rivers: color commentator/rotating studio analyst (2025–present)
- Robbie Hummel: color commentator/rotating studio analyst (2025–present)
- Derek Fisher: color commentator (2025–present)
- Brian Scalabrine: color commentator/rotating studio analyst (2025–present)
- Brad Daugherty: color commentator/rotating studio analyst (2025–present)
- Doc Rivers: color commentator/rotating studio analyst (2026–present)
- Zora Stephenson: sideline reporter (2025–present)
- Ashley ShahAhmadi: sideline reporter (2025–present)
- Grant Liffman: sideline reporter/insider host (2025–present)
- Jordan Cornette: sideline reporter (2025–present)
- John Fanta: sideline reporter/play-by-play (2025–present)
- Chris Mannix: insider (2025–present)
- Carmelo Anthony: studio analyst (2025–present)
- Vince Carter: studio analyst (2025–present)
- Tracy McGrady: studio analyst (2025–present)

=== WNBA ===
- Zora Stephenson: lead play-by-play (2026–present)
- Noah Eagle: play-by-play (2026–present)
- Michael Grady: play-by-play (2026–present)
- Sarah Kustok: lead color commentator (2026–present)
- LaChina Robinson: color commentator/alternate studio host (2026–present)
- Derek Fisher: color commentator (2026–present)
- Ashley ShahAhmadi: lead sideline reporter (2026–present)
- Caroline Pineda: sideline reporter (2026–present)
- Jordan Cornette: sideline reporter (2026–present)
- Sue Bird: studio analyst (2026–present)
- Cheryl Miller: studio analyst (2026–present)
- Tina Charles: contributor (2026–present)

=== MLB ===
- Jason Benetti: Sunday Night Baseball play-by-play (2026–present)
- Matt Vasgersian: Sunday Leadoff play-by-play (2026–present)
- Dave Flemming: alternate play-by-play (2026–present)
- Tom McCarthy: alternate play-by-play (2026–present)
- Clayton Kershaw: Inside the Pitch analyst (2026–present)
- Anthony Rizzo: Inside the Pitch analyst (2026–present)
- Joey Votto: Inside the Pitch analyst (2026–present)
- Adam Ottavino: Inside the Pitch analyst (2026–present)
- CC Sabathia: Inside the Pitch/studio analyst (2026–present)
- Eric Hosmer: Inside the Pitch/studio analyst (2026–present)
- Ashley ShahAhmadi: sideline reporter (2026–present)
- Caroline Pineda: sideline reporter (2026–present)
- John Fanta: sideline reporter (2026-present)
- Jordan Cornette: sideline reporter (2026–present)

=== Hockey ===
- Mike Emrick: lead play-by-play (2006–2020)
- Dave Strader: play-by-play (2006–2009, 2011–2015)
- Kenny Albert: play-by-play (2006, 2010, 2011–2015); #2 play-by-play (2015–2020); lead play-by-play (2021)
- Chris Cuthbert: play-by-play (2006–2007, 2014–2020)
- Gord Miller: play-by-play (2013–2021)
- John Forslund: play-by-play (2011–2020); #2 play-by-play (2021)
- Brendan Burke: play-by-play (2017–2021)
- Randy Hahn: play-by-play (2014–2021)
- Rick Peckham: play-by-play (2011–2020)
- Alex Faust: play-by-play (2018–2021)
- Eddie Olczyk: studio analyst (2006), lead color commentator (2007–2021)
- Pierre McGuire: lead "Inside the Glass" reporter (2006–2021)
- Brian Engblom: lead studio analyst (2005–2011); booth color commentator/"Inside the Glass" reporter (2011–2015)
- Darren Pang: "Inside the Glass" reporter (2007–2021)
- Joe Micheletti: "Inside the Glass" reporter/booth color commentator (2006–2007, 2011–2021)
- A. J. Mleczko: color commentator (2018–2021)
- Ray Ferraro: "Inside the Glass" reporter (2015–2021)
- Brian Boucher: "Inside the Glass" reporter/studio analyst (2015–2019); lead "Inside the Glass" reporter (2019–2021)
- Jamie Baker: color commentator (2014–2021)
- Bret Hedican: "Inside the Glass" reporter (2014–2021)
- Daryl Reaugh: "Inside the Glass" analyst (2012–2021)
- Jim Fox: color commentator (2014–2021)
- Brian Hayward: color commentator (2014–2021)
- Liam McHugh: lead studio host (2014–2021)
- Mike Milbury: lead studio analyst (2008–2020), substitute lead color commentator (2017–2020)
- Keith Jones: lead studio analyst (2005–2021)
- Kathryn Tappen: alternate studio host (2014–2021)
- Jeremy Roenick: studio analyst (2010, 2014–2019); NHL outdoor games reporter (2014–2019)
- Anson Carter: studio analyst (2012–2021), "Inside the Glass" reporter (2014)

=== Motorsports ===
- Rick Allen: lead NASCAR lap-by-lap (2015–2021), studio host (2014–2021), reserve IndyCar lap-by-lap announcer (2016–2017), reserve IMSA lap-by-lap announcer (2019–2021)
- Jon Beekhuis: pit reporter (2013–2021), color commentator (2009–2012)
- Townsend Bell: color commentator (2013–2021), pit reporter (2012)
- Dave Burns: pit reporter (2015–2021), lead lap-by-lap (2015–2021)
- Jeff Burton: color commentator (2015–2021), studio host (2014–2021)
- Jac Collinsworth: Host/Features Reporter (2021)
- Leigh Diffey: lead IndyCar lap-by-lap announcer (2013–2021), reserve NASCAR lap-by-lap announcer (2015–2021), lead IMSA lap-by-lap announcer (2019–2021)
- Kevin Lee: pit reporter (2010–2021), reserve Indycar lead lap-by-lap (2014–2021), reserve IMSA lap-by-lap announcer (2019–2021)
- Dale Earnhardt Jr.: NASCAR analyst (2018–2021)
- Ray Evernham: color commentator (2015–2021 – Whelen Modified Tour)
- Dale Jarrett: studio analyst (2015–2021)
- Parker Kligerman: studio analyst (2014–2021), color commentator (2015 – NASCAR K&N Pro Series), pit reporter (2016–2021)
- Kelli Stavast: pit reporter (2015–2021)
- Katie Hargitt: pit reporter (2015–2021)
- Anders Krohn: color commentator (2014–2021 – Indy Lights), pit reporter (2017–2021)
- Steve Letarte: color commentator (2015–2021)
- Robin Miller: pit reporter (2011–2021)
- Kyle Petty: studio analyst (2014–2021)
- Ralph Sheheen: lead lap-by-lap (2015–2021), pit reporter (2016)
- Jason Weigandt: lead lap-by-lap (2012–2021)
- Frank Stoddard: studio analyst (2014–2021), color commentator (2015 – NASCAR K&N Pro Series)
- Brian Till: reserve IndyCar lap-by-lap (2012–2016), reserve IMSA lap-by-lap (2019–2021)
- Calvin Fish: color commentator (2019–2021)
- A. J. Allmendinger: color commentator (2019–2021), studio analyst (2019–2021)
- Paul Tracy: color commentator (2014–2021)
- Ricky Carmichael: color commentator (2019–2021)
- Daniel Blair: reporter (2019–2021)
- Grant Langston: color commentator (2012–2021)
- Bob Varsha: reserve lap-by-lap (2013–2014)
- Brian Vickers: studio analyst (2015–2021)
- Krista Voda: studio host (2015–2020)
- Dillon Welch: pit reporter (2018–2021)
- Rutledge Wood: Features reporter (2014–2021)
- Brad Daugherty: studio analyst (2020–2021)
- James Hinchcliffe: color analyst (2020–2021)

=== Soccer ===
- Arlo White: lead Play-by-play announcer/alternate studio host (2013–2022)
- Lee Dixon: lead color commentator (2013–present)
- Graeme Le Saux: lead color commentator (2013–present)
- Tim Howard: alternate commentator (2013–2016); studio analyst (2020–present)
- Geoff Cameron: analyst (2014–present)
- Steve Bower: contributor/play-by-play/alternate studio host (2013–2021)
- Robbie Earle: studio analyst/alternate commentator (2013–present)
- Rebecca Lowe: lead studio host (2013–present)
- Robbie Mustoe: studio analyst (2013–present)
- Kyle Martino: studio analyst (2013–2017; 2018–2020)
- Roger Bennett: contributor (2014–present)
- Michael Davies: contributor (2014–2021)

=== Mixed martial arts ===
- Bas Rutten: lead commentator (2012–2021)
- Todd Harris: co-commentator (2012–2021)
- Sean O'Connell: co-commentator (2018–2021)
- Brian Stann: studio analyst (2018–2021)
- Yves Edwards: studio analyst (2018–2021)
- Randy Couture: studio analyst (2014–2021)
- Caroline Pearce: reporter (2018–2021)
- Kenny Rice: co-commentator (2013–2021)
- Chael Sonnen: lead commentator (2015–2016)
- Renzo Gracie: co-commentator (2016–2021)

== Programming ==
=== Event coverage ===
==== Basketball ====
- NBA on NBC (2025–present)
  - Monday night games and select playoff games
- WNBA on NBC (2026–present)
  - Select regular season and select playoff games

==== Baseball ====
- Major League Baseball on NBC (2026–present)
  - Select Sunday afternoon and night games
  - Select Wild Card games
  - MLB draft

==== College sports ====
- College Football on NBC Sports (2006–2021, 2025–present)
  - Big Ten Conference football
- College Basketball on NBC Sports (2007–2021, 2025–present)
  - Big Ten Conference men's and women's basketball
  - Big East Conference men's and women's basketball
  - Big 12 Conference men's and women's basketball
- Notre Dame Football on NBC (2011–2021, 2026–present)

==== Motorsport ====
- International Motor Sports Association (2019–2021, 2026–present)
- SuperMotocross World Championship (2026–present)
  - AMA Supercross Championship
  - AMA Motocross Championship

==== Soccer ====
- Premier League on NBC (2013–2021, 2025–present)

==== Olympics ====
- Olympics on NBC
  - Gold Zone whiparound show

==== Other sports ====
- Thoroughbred Racing on NBC
  - Kentucky Derby and Kentucky Oaks undercard races
- Tour de France (1999–2021, 2025–present)
- Golf on NBC (2025–present)
  - Select coverage of the U.S. Open and The Open Championship

=== Former ===
==== Olympics ====
- Olympics on NBC: Summer and Winter Games (2012–2021)
- Youth Olympic Games (2014–2020)
- Paralympic Games (2014–2021)

==== Motor sports ====
- NASCAR on NBC (1999–2006, 2015–2021)
  - NASCAR Cup Series (2015–2021), (12 races, practice & qualifying sessions)
  - NASCAR Xfinity Series (2015–2021), (15 races, practice & qualifying sessions)
  - ARCA Menards Series East/ARCA Menards Series West (2015–2021)
  - NASCAR Whelen Modified Tour/NASCAR Whelen Southern Modified Tour (2015–2021)
  - NASCAR PEAK Mexico Series (2015)
  - Denny Hamlin Short Track Showdown (2015)
- IndyCar Series on NBC (2009–2021)
  - Eight-races televised by NBC include Indianapolis 500
  - Indy Lights live coverage shown on NBC Sports Gold and Tape-Delayed on NBCSN
  - Road to Indy highlights package for Indy Pro 2000 Championship & USF2000
- Lucas Oil AMA Pro Motocross (2012–2021) (Moto2 450 & 250 races shared with NBC, also streamed on Live Extra)
- AMA Supercross Championship (2019–2021)
  - 3 Races to be exclusively on NBC
  - Free Practice, Qualifying & All Races Live & On-Demand by NBC Sports Gold Supercross Pass
- Monster Jam (2019–2021)
  - 26 episodes per season
- Formula One (2013–2017)
  - FIA Formula 2 Championship (2013–2017, tape delayed)
- Red Bull Global Rallycross (2014–2017)
  - GRC Lites races (2015–2017)
  - re-airings of all Supercar races (2014–2017)
- Speed Energy Formula Off-Road (2013–2014, tape delayed)
- TORC: The Off Road Championship (2014, tape delayed)
- ARCA Racing Series (2013, tape delayed)
- MotoGP World Championship (2020–2021)
  - Include Moto2 and Moto3 Races
- Superbike World Championship (2020–2021)
  - Include WorldSSP and WorldSSP300 Races

==== Soccer ====
- FIFA World Cup and FIFA Women's World Cup (selected games in Spanish, simulcast from Telemundo or Universo) (2018–2019)
- FA Women's Super League

==== Hockey ====
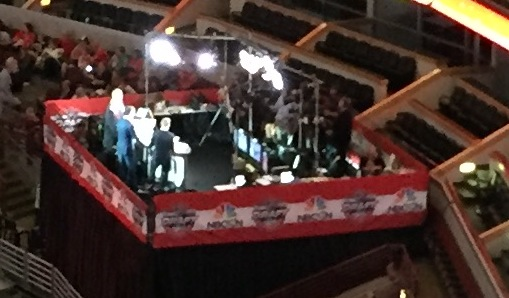
NBCSN broadcast set at the 2017 NHL entry draft

- NHL on NBC (2005–2021)
  - Weekly games
  - NHL All-Star Game
  - Stanley Cup Playoffs
  - Stanley Cup Final
  - NHL entry draft

==== Rugby union ====
- Rugby World Cup (2011–2019)
- USA Sevens (2012–2020)
- English Premiership (2016–2021)
- Six Nations Championship (2018–2021)
- Super Rugby (2019–2020)

==== College sports ====
- College Football on NBCSN (2006–2021)
  - Bayou Classic (Southern-Grambling State) (2015–2021)
- Notre Dame Football on NBC (2011–2021)
  - Pre-game show
  - Notre Dame spring game (Blue-Gold game)
- College Basketball on NBCSN (2007–2021)
  - Atlantic 10 men's and women's regular season contests
  - Atlantic 10 men's tournament, second round and quarterfinals
- Notre Dame Hockey on NBCSN (2012–2021)

==== Other sports ====
- KFC Big Bash League Cricket (2016–2018)
- Suncorp Super Netball (2019–2021)
- Netball World Cup (2019)
- FINA World Aquatics Championships
- World Athletics Championships
- World Chase Tag (2020–2021)
- Thoroughbred Racing on NBC (2011–2021)
  - Triple Crown pre-race coverage
  - Undercard races
  - Breeders' Cup (All races other than the Breeders' Cup Classic)
- USA Pro Cycling Challenge (2011–2015)
- National Pro Grid League (2014–2016)
- World Series of Fighting (2012–2016)
- Professional Fighters League (2017–2018)
- Premier Boxing Champions (2015–2016)
- Curling Night in America (2015–2020)

WSOF was formed in 2012, having signed a broadcast deal with the NBC Sports Network. This was the third MMA promotion that NBC Sports has hosted, having broadcast World Extreme Cagefighting and Ultimate Fighting Championship events when the channel was formerly known as Versus. NBC Sports had been one of the bidders for the rights to broadcast future UFC events, but Fox acquired it instead. However, some journalists regarded WSOF's deal with NBC Sports to be a considerable coup for a debuting promotion, considering NBC Sports' previous interest in the UFC. Upon the announcement of the broadcast deal, WSOF President Ray Sefo stated that the promotion wanted to host 8–10 events per year, whilst holding a one-year deal with NBC Sports. However, the next day, an NBC spokesman revealed that the deal only covered WSOF's inaugural event, with the option for more, should NBC hold a positive evaluation. On February 4, 2013, it was reported by several news outlets that NBC Sports signed a 3-year deal with WSOF.

On December 16, 2012, NBC Sports Network, along with CNBC, aired a portion of the Sunday Night Football game between the San Francisco 49ers and the New England Patriots. This was because the game's coverage on NBC was interrupted by President Barack Obama's press conference following the Sandy Hook Elementary School shooting. NBCSN continued to serve as overflow coverage for Sunday Night Football and other NFL games covered by NBC in the event the ongoing game was interrupted by an NBC News special coverage until the channel's closure.

On July 23, 2013, NBC announced that coverage of NASCAR racing would return to NBC beginning in the 2015 season under a new contract lasting through 2024. The deal includes broadcast rights to the second half of the NASCAR Playoffs and Xfinity Series seasons; the majority of which aired on NBCSN.

On August 17, 2014, NBCSN aired rain-delayed coverage of the USGA's 2014 United States Amateur Challenge, making it the first golf event to be televised on the network.

=== Original programming ===
Original programs aired by the network include NBC SportsTalk, and the weekly CNBC Sports Biz, which both debuted in the fall of 2011 (the latter ending when Darren Rovell moved to ESPN as their sports business correspondent). Bob Costas hosts Costas Tonight, which consists of monthly interview episodes, and quarterly town hall specials, the first of which aired from Indianapolis on February 2, 2012, as part of NBC's overall coverage of Super Bowl XLVI.

The network also added more documentary-style series, including 36, Caught Looking (a weekly series co-produced with Major League Baseball), and Sports Illustrated, a monthly series produced in conjunction with the magazine of the same name.

On August 13, 2012, NBCSN premiered a new morning show, The 'Lights, which consists of a 20-minute loop of sports highlights with no on-camera personalities, repeated from 7:00 to 9:00 a.m. ET.

In 2014, NBCSN premiered a new auto-themed reality series Mecum Dealmakers. It was renewed for a second season in 2015.

In April 2016, NBCSN acquired rights to air the Dan Patrick-hosted Sports Jeopardy! The premiere run followed nightly 2016 Summer Olympics coverage, and joined NBCSN's Wednesday night schedule later in October.

In February 2019, it was announced that The Dan Patrick Show would be canceled and replaced by an encore of PFT Live and an hour-long simulcast block of British sister channel Sky Sports News. In April 2020, it was announced that the latter would be replaced by the new NFL studio show NBC Sports Football Flex on April 13.

== Carriage ==
=== NBCSN revivial ===
At launch, NBCSN was only available on YouTube TV. The network was added to Comcast-owned Xfinity on November 25, 2025, and to FuboTV in June 2026.

=== Original NBCSN ===
At the beginning of September 2009, DirecTV pulled Versus from its lineup, as it was unable to reach terms on a rate increase demanded by Comcast. In public statements (including a message shown on the channel which formerly carried Versus), DirecTV scolded Comcast for its "unfair and outrageous demands", and considered the company to be "simply piggish" in its demands for higher rates, as it derisively pronounced Versus as "a paid programming and infomercial channel with occasional sporting events." On March 15, 2010, an agreement was reached between the two sides and Versus returned to DirecTV's lineup. The channel was returned to its original package on the service, Choice Xtra. The network then drastically reduced its paid programming blocks to a more traditional late night-only arrangement under NBC management (between 3 a.m. and 7 a.m. Eastern time), and mainly limited their offerings to trusted advertisers such as Time Life. The paid programming itself was also subject to pre-emption with live sports from Asia or Australia, and fully put on hiatus during Olympic coverage.

== High definition ==
A 1080i high-definition feed of the network was launched in January 2007. Initially, its HD feed was shared with sister network Golf Channel in an arrangement marketed as Versus/Golf HD; Golf Channel programming was broadcast during the daytime hours, and Versus programming was broadcast during the evening and primetime hours with some schedule variation during Tour de France coverage. The shared channel was replaced by individual HD feeds for both channels in December 2008.

In May 2013, the network's standard-definition feed was converted to a widescreen presentation with letterboxing to duplicate the display seen on the high-definition feed in line with their competitors' presentations of their SD channels.
