= NBC Sports =

Sports division of NBC

- Type: Division
- Industry: Broadcasting
- Genre: Sports
- Founded: May 17, 1939; 87 years ago
- Key people: Richard Cordella (President, NBC Sports)
- Brands: NBCSN; NBC Sports NOW; NBC Sports Regional Networks; Peacock; Telemundo; TeleXitos; Universo
- Services: NCAA football (Big Ten and Notre Dame); NFL (Sunday Night Football and playoffs); NBA (including playoffs); WNBA; MLB (Sunday Leadoff, Sunday Night Baseball and postseason); Olympics; Golf (PGA Tour, U.S. Open and The Open); NCAA men's basketball (Big Ten, Big East Conference, Big 12 and Atlantic 10); Tour de France; NCAA women's volleyball (Big Ten); Motorsport (IMSA, SuperMotocross World Championship and NASCAR [sublicensed from USA Sports]); Thoroughbred Racing; Premier League (produced by USA Sports)
- Owner: NBCUniversal
- Parent: NBC Sports Group
- Website: nbcsports.com

NBC Sports is an American sports programming division for NBCUniversal, a division of Comcast, and owned and operated through its subsidiary NBC Sports Group, that is responsible for sports broadcasts on its broadcast network NBC, its cable channels, and its streaming service Peacock. Founded on May 17, 1939, originally as "a service of NBC News", NBC Sports broadcasts a diverse array of sports events, including Big East basketball, Big Ten football and basketball, NASCAR, the National Basketball Association (NBA), the National Football League (NFL), Major League Baseball (MLB), Notre Dame football, the Olympic Games, PGA Tour golf, the Premier League, the Tour de France and Thoroughbred racing among others.

With Comcast's acquisition of NBCUniversal in 2011, its own cable sports networks were aligned with NBC Sports into a part of the NBC Sports Group division. In 2026, NBCUniversal spun off most of their cable channels to form Versant and NBC Sports may still produce Olympics coverage and other selected telecasts on those networks.

== History ==
=== 2000s ===
In 2000, NBC declined to renew its broadcast agreement with Major League Baseball (MLB). In 2002, NBC was additionally outbid by ESPN and ABC for the National Basketball Association (NBA)'s new broadcast contract, ending the league's twelve-year run on NBC.

Former logo for NBC Sports, used from 1989 until 2011

During this era, NBC experimented with broadcasting emerging sports. In 2001, NBC partnered with the World Wrestling Federation (WWF) to establish the XFL – a new football league which introduced modified rules and debuted to tremendous, but short-lived fanfare, only lasting one season (NBC shared broadcast rights to the league's games, which were mainly held on Saturday nights, with UPN). In 2003, NBC obtained the broadcast rights and a minority interest in the Arena Football League (AFL). NBC televised weekly games on a regional basis, as well as the entire playoffs. The deal lasted four years, after which the league and NBC parted ways.

Beginning with the 1999 NASCAR Winston Cup Series, NBC began its foray into NASCAR. NBC, along with Fox and TNT, obtained the broadcast rights of the top two series – the NASCAR Cup Series and NASCAR Xfinity Series – in a six-year deal, beginning in 2001. NBC televised the second half of the season and alternated coverage of the Daytona 500 with Fox. In December 2005, NBC announced that it would not renew its agreement with NASCAR. In 2001, NBC obtained the broadcast rights to horse racing's Triple Crown of Thoroughbred Racing in a five-year deal.

In 2004, NBC reached a broadcast agreement with the National Hockey League (NHL). The revenue-sharing deal called for the two sides to split advertising revenue after NBC recouped the expenses. Games were supposed to begin airing on NBC during the 2004–05 season, however a league lockout that resulted in the cancellation of that season delayed the start of the contract until the second half of the 2005–06 NHL season. NBC televised regular season games at first on Saturday afternoons before moving the telecast to Sundays, Saturday and Sunday afternoon playoff games, and up to five games of the Stanley Cup. Additionally in 2008, NBC broadcast the 2008 NHL Winter Classic, an outdoor NHL game played on New Year's Day at Ralph Wilson Stadium, a success in attendance and television ratings. The following year's Winter Classic would become the most-watched regular season game in 34 years. In addition to this regular season success, game seven of the 2009 Stanley Cup Final was watched by an average of eight million viewers, the highest ratings for an NHL game in 36 years.

The NFL also returned to NBC in 2006 after an eight-year hiatus, broadcasting the league's new flagship Sunday Night Football game, along with select postseason games and Super Bowls XLIII, XLVI, XLIX, LII, LVI, LX and LXIV.

=== 2010s: Comcast/NBCUniversal era ===
Former logo of NBC Sports, used from 2011 until 2023

In January 2011, Comcast finalized its acquisition of a majority share in NBC Universal. As a result of the merger, the operations of Comcast's existing sports networks, such as Golf Channel and NBCSN, were merged into an entity known as the NBC Sports Group. NBC Sports' senior vice president Mike McCarley additionally became Golf Channel's new head. NBC Sports' golf production unit was merged with Golf Channel, along with NBC's on-air staff, with that unit rebranding under the banner "Golf Channel on NBC", while Versus was reformatted toward a more mainstream audience, renamed the NBC Sports Network and eventually rebranded as NBCSN.

The merger also helped influence an extension of NBC Sports' contract with the NHL; the 10-year deal – valued at close to $2 billion, unified the cable and broadcast television rights to the league and introduced a new "Black Friday" Thanksgiving Showdown game on NBC, along with national coverage for every game in the Stanley Cup playoffs. On July 3, 2011, ESPN obtained the exclusive broadcast rights to The Championships, Wimbledon in a 12-year deal, ending NBC's television relationship with The Championships after 42 years.

From 2012 until 2015, Major League Soccer (MLS) games were shown on NBC and the NBC Sports Network. This included the broadcast of two regular season games, two playoff games, and two national team matches on NBC and 38 regular season games, three playoff games, and two national team matches on NBC Sports Network. Since the 2013–14 season NBC Sports has also held the rights to televise Premier League soccer in English (primarily on NBCSN) and Spanish (on Telemundo and Universo), through a $250 million deal, replacing ESPN and Fox Soccer as the league's U.S. broadcasters.

NBC Sports held broadcast rights to the Formula One (formerly held by Speed and Fox Sports) from 2013 until 2017. The majority of its coverage (including much of the season, along with qualifying and practice sessions) aired on NBCSN, while NBC aired the Monaco Grand Prix, Canadian Grand Prix and the final two races of the season, which in the first year of the deal included the United States Grand Prix. All races were also streamed online and through the NBC Sports Live Extra mobile app. They lost the broadcast rights to ESPN beginning from the 2018 season.

On March 18, 2013, nearly all of the operations for NBC Sports and NBCSN began to be based out of a purpose-built facility in Stamford, Connecticut. The move was made mainly to take advantage of tax credits given by the state of Connecticut, which NBC has taken advantage of previously with the tabloid talk shows of its NBCUniversal Television Distribution. Only Football Night in America remained in New York City, at NBC Studios, until September 7, 2014, when production of that program also moved to Stamford.

NASCAR returned to NBC Sports properties in 2015 under a ten-year deal, with NBC once again airing the second half of the NASCAR Cup Series and NASCAR Xfinity Series seasons. While no specific financial details were disclosed, NBC reportedly paid 50% more than ESPN and TNT (who took over the portion of the season previously held by NBC) combined under the previous deal.

In May 2015, NBCUniversal announced the formation of NBC Deportes (later renamed Telemundo Deportes), which serves as a Spanish language branch of NBC Sports for Telemundo and NBC Universo.

On June 7, 2015, amid its loss of rights to the USGA's championships to Fox (including the U.S. Open), NBC Sports and The R&A agreed to a twelve-year deal to televise The Open Championship, Senior Open Championship, and Women's British Open on NBC and Golf Channel, beginning in 2017. Existing rightsholder ESPN opted out of its final year of its agreement for the tournaments, with the Open subsequently debuting a year early in 2016.

Universal Sports ceased operations in November 2015. NBCUniversal acquired the rights to the content that was previously held by Universal Sports Network. Much of the programming moved to either Universal HD, NBCSN and NBC Sports Live Extra.

From 2016 until 2018, NBC Sports held the rights to Premiership Rugby, the top division of English rugby union, through a three-year deal. The contract included up to 24 regularly scheduled games on NBCSN per-season, and up to 50 streaming. Its first live match was on March 12, 2016, when London Irish hosted Saracens F.C. at Red Bull Arena in Harrison, New Jersey.

In June 2016, NBC Sports launched NBC Sports Gold, a suite of sport-specific over-the-top subscription services that would included expanded and overflow coverage of its properties.

On July 15, 2017, NBCUniversal relaunched Universal HD as Olympic Channel, a network that would carry Olympic sports programming as a complement to its long-standing agreement to cover the Games.

In early 2018, it was announced that NBC Sports would renew its contract with the IndyCar Series (continuing a relationship with NBCSN which began in 2009 as Versus), through 2021, and acquire the broadcast television rights previously held by ABC. NBC televises eight races per-season since 2019, including the series flagship Indianapolis 500, with the remaining races airing on NBCSN as before. An IndyCar package is also offered through NBC Sports Gold. Shortly after, NBC announced a six-year agreement with the International Motor Sports Association beginning in 2019, including the WeatherTech SportsCar Championship, with the majority of coverage on NBCSN.

=== 2020s ===
Following the launch of NBCUniversal's streaming service Peacock, NBC Sports began to migrate some of its overflow content (including the Premier League and other NBC Sports Gold services) to the service. On June 29, 2020, Fox sold the last seven years of its contract to air USGA tournaments to NBC, regaining rights to the U.S. Open for the first time since 2015.

In January 2021, it was reported that NBCUniversal planned to shut down NBCSN by the end of the year; an internal memo cited increased competition from streaming services and the other mainstream sports networks as reasoning. The channel was officially shut down on December 31, 2021; its remaining programming rights were moved to other NBCUniversal platforms, particularly USA Network and Peacock.

NBC's contract with the NHL expired after the 2020–21 season, with the league signing new contracts with ESPN and TNT.

On April 6, 2022, NBC Sports announced a deal to carry a package of Sunday afternoon MLB games on Peacock branded as MLB Sunday Leadoff beginning in the 2022 season. NBC Sports declined to renew its deal after the 2023 season, with the package moving to Roku instead.

On July 1, 2022, NBC Sports announced that Olympic Channel would shut down as a linear channel on September 30, 2022.

On August 18, 2022, NBC Sports announced a seven-year deal to carry Big Ten Conference college athletics across its platforms beginning in the 2023–24 academic season. This contract will most notably include a new package of primetime Big Ten college football games on NBC beginning in the 2023 season, as well as a package of college basketball and Olympic sports coverage on Peacock.

Beginning with the 2023 NFL season, Peacock exclusively streams at least one regular season game per season. Most notably, Peacock exclusively streamed the Miami Dolphins–Kansas City Chiefs wild card playoff game during the 2023 season. The game drove 2.8 million sign-ups to Peacock and averaged 23 million viewers.

In June 2023, NBC Sports launched a free ad-supported streaming channel. The channel was rebranded to NBC Sports NOW in January 2024.

On June 11, 2024, TNT Sports officially announced a 10-year deal with the French Open, ending a broadcasting arrangement with NBC Sports dating back to 1983. Two days later, IndyCar and Fox agreed to a deal to broadcast the IndyCar Series, ending its 15-year partnership with NBC Sports.

On June 27, 2024, NBC Sports and the Big East Conference announced a six-year deal to begin in the 2025–26 academic year. NBC Sports will carry more than 60 men's and women's basketball regular season and tournament games. Peacock begins its coverage in the 2024–25 academic year with 25 regular season games and five early round and quarterfinal conference tournament games in men's basketball.

On July 23, 2024, Comcast confirmed during a conference call with investors that the NBA would return to NBC Sports in the 2025–26 season under an 11-year agreement; an official announcement was released by the NBA and NBC Sports the following day. NBC and Peacock will carry 100 regular season games throughout the season, including Monday night games on Peacock, regional Tuesday night games, and a package of Sunday night games following the conclusion of NFL season. NBC will also carry a doubleheader on Martin Luther King Jr. Day, coverage of All-Star Weekend, and a slate of playoff games (including six conference finals over the length of the agreement). Rights to the NBA Finals will remain exclusive to ABC. The agreement also includes broadcasting rights to the Women's National Basketball Association (WNBA). NBC Sports' WNBA package includes more than 50 regular-season and first-round playoff games, seven WNBA semi-finals, and three WNBA Finals. WNBA games will air on NBC, USA Network, and Peacock.

On November 13, 2025, NBCUniversal announced that they would relaunch NBCSN starting November 17. The relaunched network was initially available through YouTube TV before eventually launching the platform through Xfinity. The revived NBCSN is expected to carry most live events that are streamed on Peacock, including NBA Monday night games, Premier League matches, college football and basketball, WNBA, and golf among others. The relaunch of NBCSN came after Comcast decided to spin off most of its cable networks to Versant, with USA Network in particular reviving the USA Sports division. Both NBCUniversal and Versant also made an agreement that NBC Sports-produced coverage of the 2026 Winter Olympics would continue to appear on CNBC and USA Network.

On November 19, 2025, NBC Sports announced a new three-year deal to broadcast MLB games, with a deal consisting of Sunday Night Baseball, Opening Day and Labor Day primetime games, MLB Sunday Leadoff, MLB draft, All-Star Futures Game, and Wild Card Series games. Additionally, the network plans to broadcast all games exclusively on July 5, dubbed Roadblock. For 2027 and 2028, NBC will also showcase one of MLB's most popular special event games, as well as Game 2,430, the most consequential regular season game on the season's final day. Games will be streamed on Peacock and televised across NBC and NBCSN.

== Olympics ==
In 1964, NBC televised the 1964 Summer Olympics in Tokyo; in 1972, NBC televised the 1972 Winter Olympics for the first time. 1980 would prove to be a stinging disappointment for the network; after contentious negotiations, NBC won the broadcast rights to the 1980 Summer Olympics. After the Soviet Union invaded Afghanistan, the United States and 64 other countries boycotted the event. NBC substantially scaled back its coverage and lost heavily in advertising revenue. In 1988, NBC televised the 1988 Summer Olympics in Seoul. Since then, it has branded itself as "America's Olympic Network", televising every Summer Olympic Games since the Seoul event, as well as every Winter Olympic Games since 2002 Winter Olympics. In total, NBC has aired 13 Summer and Winter Olympics, the most by any one U.S. network. The Olympic Games have also become an integral part of the network.

In 1998, Ebersol was named president of NBC Sports and Olympics.

The 2010 Winter Olympics in Vancouver were watched by a total of 190 million viewers, including 27.6 million viewers of the gold medal game in men's hockey.

During the 2014 Winter Olympics in Sochi, Russia, over 500 hours of the games were broadcast across five NBC-owned television channels (NBC, NBCSN, CNBC, MSNBC and USA Network), with 1,000 hours being streamed digitally. In January, the company announced some exclusive digital-only streaming of the 2014 Olympics via the NBCOlympics.com website and the NBC Sports Live Extra app for Android and iOS, including exclusive content such as Gold Zone, Olympic Ice and NBC's Olympic News Desk.

== Branding ==
With the premiere of Sunday Night Football, NBCUniversal hired Troika Design Group to design an overall visual identity for its coverage, including branding, on-air graphics, and other visual elements.

Concurrent with the relaunch of Versus as NBC Sports Network on January 2, 2012, and the 2012 NHL Winter Classic, NBC Sports also launched a comprehensive redesign of its branding, including a new on-air graphics design built around the NBC peacock, and an updated logo for the division as a whole (replacing a logo that had been in use since 1989). The new design was also intended to be modular, allowing it to be expanded for use in larger events across multiple networks (such as the Super Bowl and the Olympic Games). A refreshed design for on-air graphics was introduced on January 1, 2015 (in time for the 2015 NHL Winter Classic and NFL playoffs), with a cleaner and brighter visual appearance.

NBC began using dedicated graphics packages specifically for Sunday Night Football during Super Bowl LII, and unveiled a second redesign for the 2022 season during Super Bowl LVI. NBC similarly diverged for its Premier League coverage in 2019, adopting elements of its new British sibling Sky Sports. In 2023, NBC transitioned college football (which had continued to use the 2015 graphics) to new graphics derived from the Sunday Night Football graphics introduced in 2022. The new college football graphics were, in turn, adapted by the NBC Sports Regional Networks for their own use in September 2024.

On August 3, 2025, NBC began using a dedicated graphics package specifically for NASCAR on NBC (now NASCAR on USA Sports) during the Iowa Cup Series race that aired on USA Network. This was the first time NBC had updated its graphics for its NASCAR coverage (which had also continued to use the 2015 graphics) since its return to the network a decade earlier. NBC's NASCAR graphics are now similar to that of NASCAR on Prime Video.

On October 7, 2025, NBC debuted a new graphics package for its NBA coverage.

== Programs throughout the years ==
=== Current programs ===
College Football on NBC Sports (1946–1965, 1991–present)

- Notre Dame Football on NBC (1991–present)
- All-American Bowl (2004–present)
- Bayou Classic (1991–2014, 2022–present)
- Big Ten Conference (2023–present)

NFL on NBC (1951–1953, 1955–1964, 1970–1997, 2006–present)

- Football Night in America (2006–present)
- NBC Sunday Night Football (2006–present)
- NFL Kickoff game (2007–present)
- NFL on Thanksgiving Day (1965–1997, 2012–present)
- NFL Wild Card playoff game (2007–present)
- NFL Divisional playoff game (2015–present)
- Super Bowl: I (shared with CBS), III, V, VII, IX, XI, XIII, XV, XVII, XX, XXIII, XXVII, XXVIII, XXX, XXXII, XLIII, XLVI, XLIX, LII, LVI, LX, LXIV, and LXVIII
- Pro Football Hall of Fame Game (2006–present, except all Summer Olympic Years)

NBA on NBC (1954–1962, 1990–2002, 2025–present)

- Opening Night
- Tuesday Night regional doubleheader
- Sunday Night games
- Monday Night game (Peacock-exclusive)
- Martin Luther King Day games (2026–present)
- NBA Showtime
- NBA All-Star Saturday Night (2026–present)
- NBA All-Star Game (1991–2002, (Note: The 1999 NBA All-Star Game was cancelled due to the 1998–99 NBA lockout.) 2026–present)
- NBA playoffs (1955–1962, 1991–2002, 2026–present)
  - NBA conference finals (partial series, 1991–2002; full series, even-numbered years from 2026 to 2036)

WNBA on NBC (1997–2002; 2026–present)

- WNBA playoffs (1998–2002; 2026–present)
  - WNBA Semi-Finals (even numbered years from 2026 to 2036 along with 2031)
- WNBA Finals (1997–2002; quadrennial from 2026–present)

Major League Baseball on NBC (1956–1989, 1994–2000, 2026–present)

  - MLB Sunday Leadoff (2022–2023, 2026–present)
  - Sunday Night Baseball (2026–present)
  - Opening Day games (2026–present)
  - Labor Day games (2026–present)
  - Wild Card Series (2026–present)
  - Major League Baseball draft (2026–present)
  - All-Star Futures Game (2026–present)
  - Game 2,430 (2027–present)

Golf on NBC (1954–present)

- PGA Championship
  - Senior PGA Championship (1990–present)
  - Women's PGA Championship (2015–present)
- Ryder Cup (1991–2025; 2027–present)
- Presidents Cup (2000–2024; 2026–present)
- The Open Championship (2016–present)
  - Senior Open Championship (2016–present)
  - Women's British Open (2016–present)
- U.S. Open (1954–1965, 1995–2014, 2020–present)
  - U.S. Women's Open (2020–present)
  - U.S. Senior Open (2020–present)

Olympics on NBC

- Summer Olympics (1964, 1980, (Note: NBC did not provide live event coverage due to the U.S.-led boycott.) and quadrennial since 1988)
- Winter Olympics (1972 and quadrennial since 2002)

College Basketball on NBC Sports (1969–1998, 2012–present)

- Big Ten Conference (2023–present)
- Big East Conference (2024–present)
- Big 12 Conference (2025–present)

Tour de France (2011–present)
Big Ten Volleyball on NBC (2024–present)
Motorsport
Drone Racing League (2019–present)
IMSA on NBC (2019–present)

- Rolex 24 at Daytona (2019–present)

SuperMotocross World Championship (2023–present)

- AMA Supercross Championship (2019–present)
- AMA Motocross Championship (2023–present)
  - Include WorldSSP and WorldSSP300 Races

Horse Racing
Thoroughbred Racing on NBC (1949–present)

- Kentucky Derby (2001–present)
- Preakness Stakes (2001–present)
- Breeders' Cup (1984–2005, 2012–present)
- Haskell Invitational Stakes (2014–present)
- Santa Anita Derby (2009–present)
- Pegasus World Cup (2017–present)
- Woodford Reserve Turf Classic (2010–present)
- Royal Ascot (2017–present)

Olympic sports

- ISU Grand Prix of Figure Skating (2004–present)
- U.S. Figure Skating Championships (2008–present)
- FINA World Aquatics Championships
- World Athletics Championships
- Diamond League
- World Men's Handball Championship (2019–present)
- USA Swimming
- USA Track & Field
- Four Continents Figure Skating Championships
- FIS Alpine Ski World Cup
- Bobsleigh World Cup
- Skeleton World Cup
- Fencing World Cup
- FINA Diving World Cup
- FIVB Beach Volleyball World Tour
- World Marathon Majors

Rugby

- Six Nations Championship (2018–present)

Other

- National Dog Show (2001–present)
- WWE Saturday Night's Main Event (1985–1991, 2006–2008, 2024–Present) (Exclusively on Peacock since 2025)

=== Former programs ===
- NBC College Football Game of the Week
  - Rose Bowl Game (1952–1988)
  - Sugar Bowl (1959–1969)
  - Orange Bowl (1965–1995)
  - Fiesta Bowl (1978–1995)
  - Cotton Bowl Classic (1953–1957, 1993–1995)
  - Gator Bowl (1996–2006)
  - Outback Bowl (1988–1992)
  - Citrus Bowl (1984–1985)
  - Army–Navy Game (1945–1953, 1955–1959, 1964–1965)
  - Blue–Gray Football Classic (1958–1963)
- Major League Baseball on NBC
  - World Series (1947 (Games 1 & 5), 1948–1976, 1978, 1980, 1982, 1984, 1986, 1988, 1995 (Games 2, 3, & 6), 1997, 1999)
  - Major League Baseball Game of the Week (1956–1989)
  - Major League Baseball: An Inside Look (1979–1989)
  - The Baseball Network (1994–1995) (co-production with ABC Sports and Major League Baseball)
  - League Championship Series (all series 1969–1975; all series in odd-numbered years 1977–1989; all series 1995 Game 3 onward; ALCS 1996, 1998, 2000; NLCS 1997, 1999)
  - Division Series (NLDS 1981; select games 1995–2000)
  - Major League Baseball All-Star Game (1950–1975; odd-numbered years 1977–1989; even-numbered years 1994–2000)
- NBA on NBC
  - NBA Christmas Special (1990–2001 (Note: No Christmas games were played in 1998 due to the 1998–99 NBA lockout.))
  - NBA Finals (1955–1962, 1991–2002)
  - 2002 FIBA World Championship
- NFL on NBC
  - National Football League (1955–1963, 1970–1997)
  - American Football League (1965–1969)
  - AFC games (1970–1997)
  - Thursday Night Football (2016–2017)
  - The NFL on NBC pregame show
    - Grandstand (1975–1976)
    - NFL 77, 78 (1977–1986)
    - NFL Live! (1987–1994)
    - NFL on NBC (1995–1997)
- NHL on NBC (1966, 1972–1975, 1990–1994, (Note: 1990–1994 rights for NHL All-Star Game only) 2005–2021)
  - NHL Winter Classic (2008–2020 (Note: The 2013 NHL Winter Classic was cancelled due to the 2012–13 NHL lockout.))
  - NHL Stadium Series (2014–2020)
  - NHL All-Star Game (1973–1975, 1990–1994, 2012, 2015–2020)
  - Stanley Cup playoffs (2006–2021)
  - Stanley Cup Final (1966, 1973–1975, 2006–2021)
- College Basketball on NBC
  - NCAA Division I men's basketball tournament (1969–1981)
- Tennis on NBC
  - The Championships, Wimbledon (1969–2011)
  - French Open (1983–2024)
- Sportsworld (1978–1992)
- Champ Car World Series (1979–1990, 1994, 2005–2007)
- American Le Mans Series (1999–2004, 2007–2008)
- Formula One (2013–2017)
- Global Rallycross (2014–2017)
- Gillette Cavalcade of Sports (1946–1960)
- Michael Jordan Celebrity Golf Classic (1990s)
- Soccer
  - FIFA World Cup (1966, 1986)
  - MLS on NBC (2012–2014)
- Superstars (1985–1990)
- XFL (2001)
- AFL on NBC (2003–2006)
- CFL on NBC (1954, 1982, 2012–2013)
- Professional Bowlers Association (1984–1991)
- Association of Volleyball Professionals (1990–2009)
- Hambletonian Stakes (2007–2012)
- Premier Boxing Champions (2015–17)
- NASCAR on NBC
  - 2002, 2004, and 2006 Daytona 500
- Extreme Championship Wrestling (2006–2010)
- MotoGP World Championship (2020–2023)
  - Include Moto2 and Moto3 Races
- IndyCar Series on NBC (2019–2024)
  - Indianapolis 500 (2019–2024)
- Superbike World Championship (2020–2023)
- Rugby World Cup (2011, 2015, 2019, 2023)
- Premier Lacrosse League (2019–2021)
- Belmont Stakes (1950–1952, 2001–2005, 2011–2022)
- Monster Jam (2019–2022)
- United States Football League (2022–2023)
- Malaysian Cub Prix (2023)
- ARCA Racing Series Presented by Menards (2013)
- NASCAR K&N Pro Series/ARCA Menards Series East (2015–2023)
- NASCAR K&N Pro Series/ARCA Menards Series West (2015–2023)

==== Moved to USA Sports ====
In 2025, broadcasting rights to numerous events that were under NBC Sports would be moved to USA Sports as a result of NBCUniversal spinning-off most of their cable channels (including Golf Channel) to form Versant. Even though these events aren't officially part of the NBC Sports portfolio anymore, they may still air on NBCUniversal-owned channels and platforms after 2025 as part of this split. Below is a list of programs that were part of this transition.

- College Basketball on USA
  - Atlantic 10 Conference (2012–present)
- NASCAR on NBC (1979–2006, 2015–present)
- Premier League on NBC (2013–present)

== Notable personalities ==
Mike Tirico, lead NBC Sports host

=== Present ===
==== Play-by-play ====
- NBC Sunday Night Football – Mike Tirico, Noah Eagle
- NBA on NBC – Mike Tirico, Noah Eagle, Terry Gannon, Michael Grady, Mark Followill, Jason Benetti, John Fanta
- Major League Baseball on NBC – Jason Benetti, Matt Vasgersian, Dave Flemming, Tom McCarthy
- WNBA on NBC – Zora Stephenson, Noah Eagle, Michael Grady, Kate Scott
- Big Ten Saturday – Noah Eagle, Paul Burmeister, Jason Benetti, Dave Flemming
- Notre Dame Football on NBC – Jason Benetti, Noah Eagle, Paul Burmeister
- HBCU Football – Chris Lewis, Kyle Draper
- College Basketball on NBC Sports – Noah Eagle, Paul Burmeister, Jac Collinsworth, Terry Gannon, Michael Grady, John Fanta, Rich Lerner, Jason Knapp, Justin Kutcher, Ted Robinson, Steve Schlanger, Zora Stephenson, Cindy Brunson, Sloane Martin, Kylen Mills, Mike Corey, Steve Burkowski, Noah Reed, Ann Schatz, Geoff Arnold, Guy Haberman, Brendan Glasheen, Brandon Gaudin, James Westling, Pete Sousa
- Olympics on NBC – Kenny Albert, Paul Burmeister, Leigh Diffey, Terry Gannon, Todd Harris, Jason Knapp, Jim Kozimor, Sloane Martin, Randy Moss, Ted Robinson, Steve Schlanger, Bill Spaulding, Chris Vosters
- NASCAR on NBC – Leigh Diffey
- IMSA on NBC – Leigh Diffey, Dave Burns, Brian Till
- Golf on NBC – Mike Tirico, Terry Gannon, Tom Abbott
- Premier League on NBC – Peter Drury, Jon Champion, Joe Speight
- World Athletics/USA Track & Field – Leigh Diffey, Bill Spaulding, Paul Swangard
- World Aquatics/USA Swimming/USA Diving – Jason Knapp, Amy Van Dyken
- SuperMotocross World Championship – Leigh Diffey, Jason Weigandt
- Tour de France – Phil Liggett
- Thoroughbred Racing on NBC – Larry Collmus

==== Color commentators ====
- NBC Sunday Night Football – Cris Collinsworth, Todd Blackledge, Jason Garrett, Terry McAulay
- NBA on NBC – Reggie Miller, Jamal Crawford, Grant Hill, Robbie Hummel, Austin Rivers, Brian Scalabrine, Derek Fisher, Brad Daugherty, Doug Collins, Mike Fratello, Jordan Cornette, Doc Rivers
- Major League Baseball on NBC – rotating analysts
- WNBA on NBC – Sarah Kustok, LaChina Robinson, Derek Fisher
- NASCAR on NBC – Steve Letarte, Jeff Burton, Dale Jarrett, Parker Kligerman, Brad Daugherty
- IMSA on NBC – Calvin Fish, Townsend Bell, James Hinchcliffe, Oliver Gavin
- Golf on NBC – Brad Faxon, Kevin Kisner, Morgan Pressel, Paige Mackenzie
- Big Ten Saturday – Todd Blackledge, Jason Garrett, Yogi Roth, Matt Cassel, Ian Book, Terry McAulay, Reggie Smith
- Notre Dame Football on NBC – Jason Garrett, Todd Blackledge, Terry McAulay, Reggie Smith
- College Basketball on NBC Sports – Robbie Hummel, Donny Marshall, Nick Bahe, Brendan Haywood, King McClure, Tim McCormick, Nik Stauskas, Tre Demps, Matt McCall, John Giannini, Darren Collison, Tom Crean, LaChina Robinson, Aliyah Boston, Julianne Viani-Braen, Meghan McKeown-Wallace, Kim Adams, Isis Young, Aja Ellison, Tyreka Carter, Dominique Patrick, Nikki Cardano-Hillary, Jess Settles
- Premier League on NBC – Lee Dixon, Graeme Le Saux, Stephen Warnock, Jim Beglin
- World Athletics/USA Track & Field – Ato Boldon, Sanya Richards-Ross, Craig Masback, Kara Goucher, Trey Hardee
- World Aquatics/USA Swimming/USA Diving – Rowdy Gaines, Elizabeth Beisel, Michael Phelps, Cynthia Potter
- SuperMotocross World Championship – Ricky Carmichael, James Stewart Jr.
- Tour de France – Bob Roll, Christian Vande Velde

==== Reporters ====
- NBC Sunday Night Football – Melissa Stark, Kaylee Hartung, Kathryn Tappen
- NBA on NBC – Zora Stephenson, Ashley ShahAhmadi, Grant Liffmann, Chris Mannix, Jordan Cornette, John Fanta, Jim Gray
- WNBA on NBC – Ashley ShahAhmadi, Jordan Cornette, Caroline Pineda
- Olympics on NBC – Melissa Stark, Kaylee Hartung, Kathryn Tappen, Andrea Joyce, Heather Cox, Britney Eurton, Lewis Johnson, Steve Porino, Tina Dixon
- NASCAR on NBC – Marty Snider, Dave Burns, Parker Kligerman, Kim Coon, Dillon Welch, Trevor Bayne
- IMSA on NBC – Marty Snider, Dave Burns, Kevin Lee, Brian Till, Matt Yocum, Amanda Busick, Chris Wilner
- Golf on NBC – Jim Mackay, Smylie Kaufman, John Wood, Cara Banks, Emilia Doran, Amy Rogers, Kira Dixon
- Big Ten Saturday – Kathryn Tappen, Caroline Pineda, Ashley ShahAhmadi, Lewis Johnson
- Notre Dame Football on NBC – Caroline Pineda, Kathryn Tappen
- College Basketball on NBC Sports – Zora Stephenson, Nicole Auerbach, Kayla Burton, Britney Eurton, Caroline Pineda, Kira Dixon, John Fanta
- World Athletics/USA Track & Field – Lewis Johnson, Todd Harris
- World Aquatics/USA Swimming/USA Diving – Ahmed Fareed, Laura Wilkinson
- AMA SuperMotocross Championship – Will Christien, Jason Thomas, Katie Osborne
- Tour de France – Steve Porino, Jens Voigt
- Thoroughbred Racing on NBC – Britney Eurton, Nick Luck, Kenny Rice

==== Studio hosts ====
- Football Night in America – Maria Taylor
- NBA Showtime and Basketball Night in America – Maria Taylor, Ahmed Fareed, Jordan Cornette
- Major League Baseball on NBC – Bob Costas, Ahmed Fareed
- WNBA on NBC – Maria Taylor, LaChina Robinson, Carolyn Manno
- Olympics on NBC – Mike Tirico, Rebecca Lowe, Jimmy Roberts, Kathryn Tappen, Ahmed Fareed, Maria Taylor, Carolyn Manno, Craig Melvin, Lindsay Czarniak, Jac Collinsworth, Damon Hack, Laura Britt, Cara Banks, Mallory Weggemann, Trenni Casey
- NASCAR on NBC – Marty Snider
- College Countdown (football) – Ahmed Fareed, John Fanta
- College Countdown (basketball) – Ahmed Fareed, Jac Collinsworth, Carolyn Manno, Lindsay Czarniak
- Premier League on NBC – Rebecca Lowe, Ahmed Fareed, Paul Burmeister, Cara Banks, Anna Jackson
- National Dog Show – John O'Hurley
- Tour de France – Paul Burmeister
- Thoroughbred Racing on NBC – Mike Tirico, Ahmed Fareed

==== Studio analysts ====
- Football Night in America – Devin McCourty, Jason Garrett, Mike Tomlin, Mike Florio, Steve Kornacki
- NBA Showtime and Basketball Night in America – Carmelo Anthony, Vince Carter, Tracy McGrady, Jamal Crawford, Brian Scalabrine, Austin Rivers, Robbie Hummel, Brad Daugherty, Derek Fisher, Chris Bosh, Kelenna Azubuike, Isiah Thomas, P. J. Carlesimo, Doc Rivers
- WNBA on NBC – Sue Bird, Cheryl Miller, Tina Charles
- MLB Countdown to First Pitch – Clayton Kershaw, Anthony Rizzo, Joey Votto, Adam Ottavino, CC Sabathia, Dexter Fowler
- NASCAR on NBC – Dale Jarrett, Brad Daugherty
- Premier League on NBC – Robbie Mustoe, Robbie Earle, Tim Howard, Danny Higginbotham, Stephen Warnock, Gary Neville, David Ornstein
- Tour de France – Christian Vande Velde, Chris Horner, Brent Bookwalter, Tejay van Garderen
- College Countdown (football) – Joshua Perry, Chris Simms, Nicole Auerbach
- College Countdown (basketball) – Jordan Cornette, Matt McCall, Calbert Cheaney, Evan Turner, Meghan McKeown-Wallace, Aliyah Boston, Nicole Auerbach, Lisa Bluder
- Thoroughbred Racing on NBC – Jerry Bailey, Randy Moss, Eddie Olczyk, Matt Bernier

==== Contributors ====
- NBA on NBC – Michael Jordan, Caitlin Clark
- Olympics on NBC – Snoop Dogg

==== Emeritus ====
- Bob Costas

=== Former ===
==== Play-by-play ====
- NFL on NBC – Dick Enberg, Don Criqui, Curt Gowdy, Marv Albert, Charlie Jones, Tom Hammond, Al Michaels
  - Thursday Night Football – Al Michaels, Mike Tirico
- Major League Baseball on NBC – Mel Allen, Bob Costas, Dick Enberg, Joe Garagiola, Curt Gowdy, Bryant Gumbel, Lindsey Nelson, Vin Scully, Bob Wolff
  - MLB Sunday Leadoff – Jason Benetti, Brendan Burke
- NBA on NBC – Greg Gumbel, Dick Enberg, Don Criqui, Mike Breen, Bob Neal, Curt Gowdy, Dan Hicks, Paul Sunderland, Jim Lampley, Tom Hammond, Marv Albert
- NHL on NBC – Tim Ryan, Mike Emrick, Dave Strader, Chris Cuthbert, Kenny Albert, Mike Tirico, John Forslund, Gord Miller, Brendan Burke, Randy Hahn, Rick Peckham, Alex Faust
- NASCAR on NBC – Bill Weber, Allen Bestwick, Rick Allen
- IndyCar Series on NBC – Bob Jenkins, Brian Till, Bob Varsha, Leigh Diffey
- IMSA on NBC – Allen Bestwick, Bill Weber
- MLS on NBC – John Strong, Steve Cangialosi, Richard Fleming
- Thoroughbred Racing on NBC – Tom Durkin
- Golf Channel on NBC – Steve Sands, George Savaricas, Grant Boone, Tom Abbott, Bob Papa, Shane Bacon
- Big Ten Saturday – Jac Collinsworth, Andrew Siciliano, Brendan Burke, Mike Tirico, Dan Hicks
- Notre Dame Football on NBC – Don Criqui, Dick Enberg, Tom Hammond, Mike Tirico, Dan Hicks, Jac Collinsworth
- SportsWorld – Paul Page
- The Championships, Wimbledon – Dick Enberg
- Formula One – Leigh Diffey, Bob Varsha
- Premier League on NBC – Steve Bower, Derek Rae, Clive Tyldesley, Bill Leslie, Arlo White
- WWE – Michael Cole, Vic Joseph, Kevin Patrick, Jim Ross, Joe Tessitore

==== Color commentators ====
- NFL on NBC – Merlin Olsen, Paul Maguire, Phil Simms, Bob Trumpy, Len Dawson, Al DeRogatis
  - NBC Sunday Night Football – John Madden
  - Thursday Night Football – Cris Collinsworth, Doug Flutie, Tony Dungy, Kurt Warner
- Major League Baseball on NBC – Joe Morgan, Bob Uecker
- NBA on NBC – Bill Walton, Matt Guokas, Doug Collins, Quinn Buckner, Tom Tolbert, Dan Issel, Chuck Daly, Cotton Fitzsimmons, Julius Erving, Steve "Snapper" Jones
- NHL on NBC – Ted Lindsay, Bill Clement, John Davidson, Eddie Olczyk, Pierre McGuire, Brian Engblom, Brian Hayward, Peter McNab, Joe Micheletti, A. J. Mleczko, Mike Johnson, Kendall Coyne Schofield, Peter McNab, Jim Fox
- NASCAR on NBC – Benny Parsons, Wally Dallenbach Jr., James Hinchcliffe, Dale Earnhardt Jr.
- IndyCar on NBC – Townsend Bell, Robbie Buhl, Jon Beekhuis, Wally Dallenbach Jr., James Hinchcliffe, Dan Wheldon, Sam Hornish Jr., David Hobbs, Steve Matchett, Anders Krohn, Paul Tracy, A. J. Allmendinger, Jimmie Johnson
- IMSA on NBC – A. J. Allmendinger, Dale Earnhardt Jr.
- MLS on NBC – Brian Dunseth, Stuart Holden, Shep Messing, Robbie Russell
- Golf Channel on NBC – Johnny Miller, Paul Azinger, Gary Koch, Justin Leonard
- Tennis on NBC – John McEnroe, Mary Carillo
- Big Ten Saturday – Colt McCoy, Kyle Rudolph, Anthony Herron
- Notre Dame Football on NBC – Pat Haden, Mike Mayock, Doug Flutie, Tony Dungy, Drew Brees
- College Basketball on NBC – Al McGuire, Billy Packer
- Formula One – David Hobbs, Steve Matchett
- Tour de France – Paul Sherwen
- WWE – Corey Graves, Pat McAfee, Booker T, Wade Barrett

==== Reporters ====
- NBC Sunday Night Football – Andrea Kremer, Alex Flanagan, Michele Tafoya
- Thursday Night Football – Heather Cox
- Major League Baseball on NBC – Bob Costas, Jim Gray, Merle Harmon, Bob Wischusen
  - MLB Sunday Leadoff – Ahmed Fareed
- NBA on NBC – Ahmad Rashad, Jim Gray, Hannah Storm, Lewis Johnson
- NASCAR on NBC – Bill Weber, Allen Bestwick, Matt Yocum, Mike Massaro, Alex Hayden, Jim Noble, Lindsay Czarniak, Dorsey Schroeder, Kelli Stavast
- NHL on NBC – Pierre McGuire, Brian Boucher, Ray Ferraro, Cammi Granato, Darren Pang
- IndyCar Series on NBC – Jack Arute, Michelle Beisner, Calvin Fish, Robbie Floyd, Gary Gerould, Brian Hammons, Bruce Jenner, Sally Larvick, Cameron Steele, Bill Stephens, Lindy Thackston, Anders Krohn, Robin Miller, Kelli Stavast, Marty Snider, Kevin Lee, Dillon Welch, Dave Burns, Georgia Henneberry
- Olympics on NBC – Lesley Visser, Chris Wragge, Craig Sager, Marty Snider
- Golf Channel on NBC – Roger Maltbie, Mark Rolfing, Notah Begay III, Damon Hack
- Big Ten Saturday – Lewis Johnson, Laura Britt
- Notre Dame Football on NBC – Lewis Johnson, Alex Flanagan
- The Championships, Wimbledon – Bud Collins
- French Open – Bud Collins
- Formula One – Will Buxton, Townsend Bell
- WWE – Byron Saxton
- Thoroughbred Racing on NBC – Donna Brothers

==== Studio hosts ====
- NFL on NBC – Gayle Gardner, Bryant Gumbel, Greg Gumbel, Jim Lampley, Bob Costas
  - NBC Sunday Night Football – Bob Costas, Dan Patrick, Keith Olbermann, Liam McHugh, Mike Tirico, Jac Collinsworth, Ahmed Fareed
  - Thursday Night Football – Mike Tirico, Bob Costas, Dan Patrick, Liam McHugh
- Major League Baseball on NBC – Bill Macatee
  - MLB Sunday Leadoff – Ahmed Fareed
- NBA on NBC – Bob Costas, Hannah Storm
- NHL on NBC – Bill Clement, Pierre McGuire, Bob Costas, Dan Patrick, Liam McHugh, Kathryn Tappen, Mike Tirico, Ahmed Fareed, Paul Burmeister, Russ Thaler
- Olympics on NBC – Bob Costas, Dick Enberg, Gayle Gardner, Curt Gowdy, Bryant Gumbel, Greg Gumbel, Jim Lampley, Dan Patrick, Alex Flanagan, Liam McHugh
- NASCAR on NBC – Bill Weber, Brian Williams, Krista Voda
- IndyCar Series on NBC – Kevin Lee, Krista Voda
- MLS on NBC – Russ Thaler
- College Countdown – Hannah Storm, Liam McHugh, Maria Taylor
- Premier League – Steve Bower, Russ Thaler, Liam McHugh, Derek Rae, Arlo White
- USFL – Sara Perlman
- WWE – Cathy Kelley, Jackie Redmond, Blake Howard, Sarah Schreiber

==== Studio analyst ====
- NFL on NBC – Ahmad Rashad, Cris Collinsworth, Mike Ditka, Joe Gibbs, Sam Wyche, Paul Maguire, Joe Montana, O. J. Simpson
  - NBC Sunday Night Football – Sterling Sharpe, Cris Collinsworth, Jerome Bettis, Tiki Barber, Hines Ward, Drew Brees, Tony Dungy, Matthew Berry, Chris Simms, Rodney Harrison
  - Thursday Night Football – Tony Dungy, Rodney Harrison
- NHL on NBC – Eddie Olczyk, Keith Jones, Patrick Sharp, Anson Carter, Mike Babcock, Dominic Moore, Ryan Callahan, Ray Ferraro, Mike Milbury, Jeremy Roenick, Brett Hull
- NASCAR on NBC – Kyle Petty
- IndyCar Series on NBC – Dale Earnhardt Jr., Danica Patrick
- College Countdown – Colt McCoy
- Notre Dame Football on NBC – Doug Flutie, Corey Robinson
- Premier League – Kyle Martino

== Presidents and chairmen ==
- Chet Simmons (1977–1979)
- Arthur Watson (1979–1989)
- Dick Ebersol (1989–2011)
- Ken Schanzer (1998–2011)
- Jon Miller (2011–present)

== See also ==
=== Related articles ===
- USA Sports – sports division of Versant

=== Main competitors ===
- ESPN/ABC – joint venture between The Walt Disney Company, Hearst Communications and NFL
- Fox Sports – sports division of Fox Corporation
- TNT Sports and CBS Sports – sports division of Skydance
