= MLS on NBC =

MLS soccer broadcast telecasts (2012–2014)

- Also known as: Major League Soccer on NBC
- Genre: MLS soccer telecasts
- Presented by: Arlo White; Kyle Martino; Russ Thaler
- Theme music composer: Cody Westheimer
- Country of origin: United States
- Original language: English

Production
- Executive producer: Sam Flood
- Production locations: Various MLS stadiums (game telecasts); NBC Studios, New York City, New York (studio segments)
- Camera setup: Multi-camera
- Running time: 180 minutes or until game ends (including commercials)
- Production company: NBC Sports

Original release
- Network: NBC; NBCSN
- Release: March 11, 2012 – November 30, 2014

The MLS on NBC is the branding used for broadcasts of Major League Soccer (MLS) games produced by NBC Sports, the sports division of the NBC television network in the United States, and broadcast on NBC and NBCSN from 2012 to 2014.

== Contract overview ==
On January 5, 2012, NBC Sports signed a three-year contract with Major League Soccer to nationally televise 40 matches per year, which would primarily air on the NBC Sports Network (now NBCSN), beginning with the 2012 season. All NBC telecasts included pre-game and post-game coverage, with the network intending to promote its games during broadcasts of its other major sports properties, such as the Olympics. More specifically as part of the new deal, NBC would carry three regular season and two playoff matches (the first time since 2002 that that many MLS games were to be broadcast on English-language network television), as well as 38 regular season and three playoff matches on sister channel NBCSN; both networks also aired matches featuring the United States men's national soccer team (with two games airing on each network).

NBC Sports took over the Major League Soccer rights from Fox Soccer and Fox Deportes. Previous deals with U.S. partners ESPN, ESPN2, ESPN Deportes and Galavisión continued in 2012, as did with Canadian partners TSN, TSN2 and GolTV.

== Performance ==
NBC Sports' ratings for MLS improved greatly due to the increased presence of NBCSN (fueled by their NHL television package), with average ratings for the games jumping 122% for the inaugural season of the contract in 2012. Yet still, several games ranked at or near the bottom of the ratings among sporting event and entertainment telecasts, whereas ESPN's MLS coverage – which was railed by fans as being inferior to NBC's – had higher viewership, attributed to the greater availability of ESPN and ESPN2 nationally.

NBC and NBCSN's MLS telecasts during the 2013 season averaged 115,000 viewers per game, a steep drop from 2012. Looking to capitalize on further soccer opportunities, NBC Sports acquired the rights to the Premier League from Fox Soccer in 2012, in time for the 2013–14 Premier League season. Speculation abounded on if MLS was to be treated by the sports division secondarily to the Premier League, which has a greater U.S. audience than the domestic league, placing MLS' future with NBC in doubt.

In 2014, negotiations broke down between NBC and MLS on a new television contract. The league instead signed an agreement with Fox Sports to serve as its U.S. broadcast partner, beginning with the 2015 season in a shared rights deal with ESPN.

NBC also operates a blog, ProSoccerTalk, which ran news headlines from Major League Soccer and other international soccer leagues. With NBC acquiring the broadcast television rights to the Premier League in 2013, significantly more coverage of the English top-flight was added to the site.

== On-air staff ==
=== Commentators ===
- Ron Burke – alternate studio host
- JP Dellacamera – alternate play-by-play
- Brian Dunseth – alternate color commentator
- Robbie Earle – alternate color commentator
- Robbie Mustoe – alternate color commentator
- Brent Harris – alternate studio host
- Kyle Martino – lead color commentator
- John Strong – lead play-by-play
- Russ Thaler – lead studio host

== See also ==
- Major League Soccer on television
- Premier League on NBC
