= Lewis Johnson (commentator) =

American television sports announcer

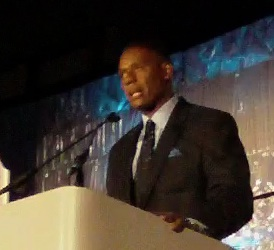
Lewis Johnson, serving as Master of Ceremonies at the USATF Jesse Owens Award banquet

Lewis Johnson (born 13 December 1962) is an American sports commentator and sports reporter. He is one of the few sports broadcasters to have worked for ABC, NBC and CBS. He has also worked for Westwood One, ESPN, the Pac-12 Network and Turner Sports.

== Education ==
Lewis is a graduate of the University of Cincinnati. The 6 ft 6 in (1.98 m) Lewis placed 8th in the 800 meters at the 1987 NCAA Championships with his personal record of 1:47.00.

== Career history ==
Johnson has worked for NBC since the 2000 Summer Olympics. He has covered Notre Dame football, the NBA, and the AFL as well as nine Olympic and two Paralympic games.

He has also worked for NBCSN, the Pac-12 Network, ESPN/ABC, CBS Sports and Turner Sports as well as Westwood One.

=== Career timeline ===
1999-2021 Bayou Classic on NBC Sideline reporter.

- Olympics on NBC (2000–present)
- Pac-12 Network football sideline reporter (2014–present)
- NBA on TNT playoff sideline reporter (2011–2017); (2019)
- NCAA March Madness (CBS/Turner) sideline reporter (2011–2017)
- NFL on Westwood One Sports sideline reporter (2012)
- College Football on ESPN sideline reporter (2012–2013)
- SEC on CBS sideline reporter (2011)
- College Football on Westwood One Sports sideline reporter (2008–2011)
- College Football on Versus sideline reporter (2007–2010)
- AFL on NBC sideline reporter (2003–2006)
- Notre Dame Football on NBC sideline reporter (2001–2006)
- NBA on NBC sideline reporter (2001–2002)
- College Football on ABC sideline reporter (1995–1999)
