= Jim Kozimor =

American spors announcer

Jim Kozimor is a television/radio sportscaster who has worked on four Olympic Games as a Play-by-Play announcer (Beijing, London, Rio, PyeongChang) for The NBC Sports Group. Play-by-Play with NBA, WNBA, MLS, College Football/Basketball & Olympic Sports background. Host/Anchor for NFL, NBA, MLB, NHL, MLS & U.S. Open events along with Daily Sports Talk program & Nightly News Sports Anchor. Previous Host of MLS on NBCS. He is a three-time Emmy Award winner.

== Olympics ==
Kozimor has been involved in four Olympic Games calling Play-by-Play of badminton in 2008 (Beijing), 2012 (London), 2016 (Rio). He also called Curling for the 2018 PyeongChang Olympic Winter Games for the NBC Sports Group. Kozimor also announced Play-by-Play for Luge, Triathlons and Shooting Sports for Universal Sports.

== Play-by-Play ==
He has worked with four NBA franchises in various broadcast capacities. Began as a back-up announcer for the Golden State Warriors (1989–92). Then did radio Play-by-Play for the Philadelphia 76ers (1992–94). He worked for the Houston Rockets and Sacramento Kings and also handled TV/Radio Play-by-Play for the WNBA Comets and Monarchs for 10 seasons. Also filled in TV Play-by-Play for Detroit Pistons basketball. Hosted Kings TV Pregame show "House Party Live".

Kozimor has currently called college basketball games for the West Coast Conference. He has called college sports in the Pac-12 for football, men's/women's basketball, baseball, water polo, volleyball and lacrosse. He has also done the Women's NCAA Tournament for Westwood One Radio (2011–12).

He was the Play-by-Play announcer for the San Jose Earthquakes of Major League Soccer from 2010 to 2012. Awarded MLS Call of the Year in 2011. In 2012 also hosted MLS on NBC Sports pregame/postgame shows on NBCSN.

From 2009 to 2011 Kozimor worked for Universal Sports and called triathlons and luge events.

== NBC Sports Bay Area/California ==
On April 4, 2011, Kozimor was hired by Comcast SportsNet Bay Area as an anchor for SportsNet Central and continued as a play-by-play announcer for the San Jose Earthquakes. Went on to host "SportsTalk Live" nightly sports talk show. Has hosted pregame and postgame shows for the Sacramento Kings, Golden State Warriors, San Francisco Giants, Oakland A's, San Jose Sharks and Oakland Raiders. Kozimor has won three Emmy Awards for his work as a host on championship parades (2015, 2016, 2018). Was Sports Anchor for NBC Bay Area Nightly News and host of "Xfinity Sports Sunday" weekend sports wrap-up show.

== Radio ==
Is currently a show host on KGMZ-FM 95.7 The Game. Hosted Raiders pregame and postgame show (2017–2019). Spent ten years in Sacramento hosting a nighttime sports talk show on KHTK-AM 1140. Co-hosted a morning radio show in Houston on KSEV with Matt Thomas (1997–98) and was a host on WMVP AM 1000 Chicago (1994–96).

== Personal life ==
Kozimor is a native of Chicago. He went to high school in Troy, Michigan and holds a bachelor's degree in communications from Michigan State University.

Kozimor and his wife Sandra have three daughters: Addison and twins Ava and Sasha.

== Broadcast history ==
2011-current: NBC Sports Bay Area show Host for NBA, NHL, MLB, NFL programming. 2002-current: Play-by-Play college sports football, basketball, baseball, volleyball, water polo 2011-2012: Women's NCAA Tournament play-by-play, Westwood One radio 2010-2012: San Jose Earthquakes—play-by-play announcer. 2018: Winter Olympics (Curling) 2008-2016: Summer Olympics (Badminton). 1998-2009: Sacramento Kings, Sacramento Monarchs broadcaster. 1996-1998: Houston Rockets & Houston Comets. 1992-1994: Philadelphia 76ers—play-by-play announcer. 1989-1992: Golden State Warriors—sideline reporter, fill-in play-by-play announcer. (1994–96): WMVP—talk show host. (1989–92, 1988–89): San Jose Jammers, La Crosse Catbirds.
