= Arlo White =

British sports broadcaster

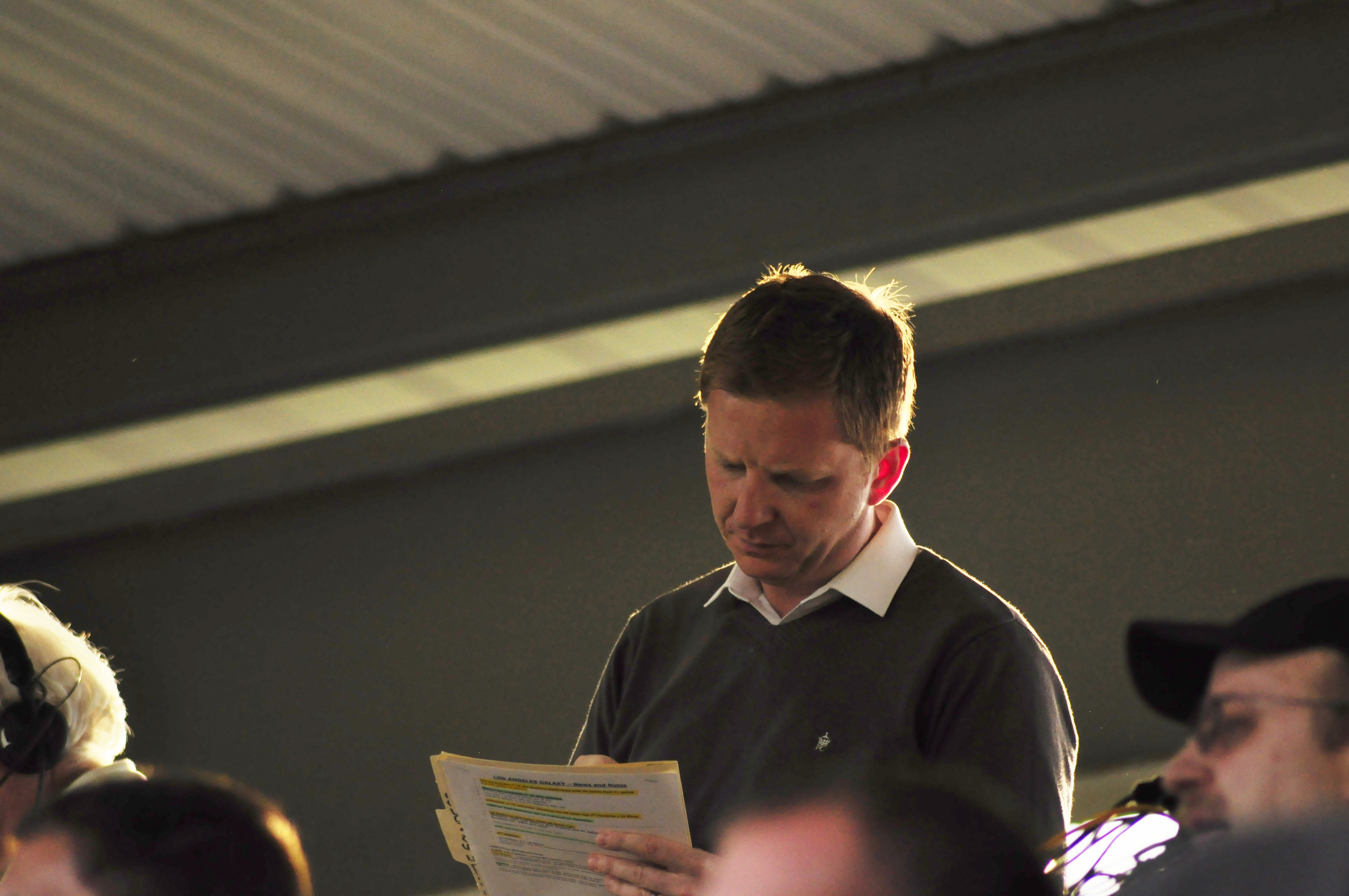
- White in 2011
- Born: Arlo James White; 2 June 1973 (age 53); Leicester, England
- Occupation: Broadcaster
- Children: 2

Arlo James White (born 2 June 1973) is an English sports presenter and commentator, originally from Leicester. He is the play-by-play commentator for the LIV Golf league. White previously worked for NBC Sports' live coverage of the Premier League in the United States as their lead play-by-play commentator, BBC Radio 5 Live as a football, cricket, and American football commentator, and for the Seattle Sounders FC and Chicago Fire FC of Major League Soccer.

== Career ==
=== Early career ===
White began broadcasting at the age of 27, after gaining experience covering non-league football for Radio Derby and also while travelling in Australia.

=== BBC Radio ===
After joining the BBC in 2001, White presented Five Live's Sport on Five and was Five Live Breakfast's sports reporter between 2002 and 2005.

He commentated on Super Bowl XLII for Radio 5 Live in February 2008.

=== Test Match Special ===
White made his Test Match Special debut in Multan for the first Test match between Pakistan and England in 2005. He was presented with his TMS tie by Vic Marks during the first day's play and was reported to be "pleased to survive his commentary spells with Geoffrey Boycott".

He commentated on England's Ashes tour of Australia 2006–07, and in 2007 the Cricket World Cup, the West Indies and India tours of England, as well as the World Twenty20 (including the final).

=== Major League Soccer ===
White became the sole commentator for the Seattle Sounders FC of Major League Soccer at the start of the 2010 season. He became acquainted with the team's broadcasting executive, Brian O'Connell, during his tenure at the BBC covering the Super Bowl and was hired after Kevin Calabro had departed from his role during the Sounders' inaugural season. White had substituted for Calabro for a regular season match against the Houston Dynamo in July 2009. He briefly returned to the BBC to join their coverage of the 2010 FIFA World Cup.

On 11 March 2012, White became the play-by-play commentator for all MLS and US National Team games on NBC and NBC Sports Network. He was recommended for the role by MLS commissioner Don Garber. As part of his duties for NBC, he was the lead football play-by-play commentator at the 2012 Olympic Games in London, where he commentated on all of the matches for the US women's national team.

On 3 March 2020, White became the play-by-play commentator for the Chicago Fire during the offseason. He was retained by the club in 2022 after joining LIV Golf, despite controversy surrounding the golf tournament and its backers.

=== Premier League ===
When NBC acquired the rights to the Premier League in 2013, White was moved from MLS broadcasts to become the network's lead Premier League voice, based in the United Kingdom. His co-commentators are either Lee Dixon or Graeme Le Saux or (for certain fixtures) both. He returned to MLS for several playoff matches, but moved to commentating Premier League matches full-time in 2014.

White has also worked as a substitute host for Rebecca Lowe on NBC's Match of the Day, Premier League Live and other studio shows.

Starting with the 2022–2023 season, Peter Drury replaced him as NBC's lead commentator for their coverage of the Premier League.

=== Other work ===
White appears as himself in several episodes of the Apple TV+ series Ted Lasso, commentating on matches of the show's fictional team AFC Richmond. It follows an earlier appearance in one of the NBC Sports short promotional videos that inspired the series.

=== Golf ===
White is the first ever voice of the LIV Golf tour.

== Personal life ==
White was named after American folk singer Arlo Guthrie. He is the father of twin daughters, who were born in 2007. White was born in Leicester and is a lifelong fan of local club Leicester City, who won the Premier League title in 2015–16 with him on call. White is also a fan of the NFL's Chicago Bears and MLB's Chicago Cubs, having first visited the city in 1986 as a 13-year-old. He is also a self-described Americanophile.
