= Paul Burmeister =

American sportscaster (born 1971)

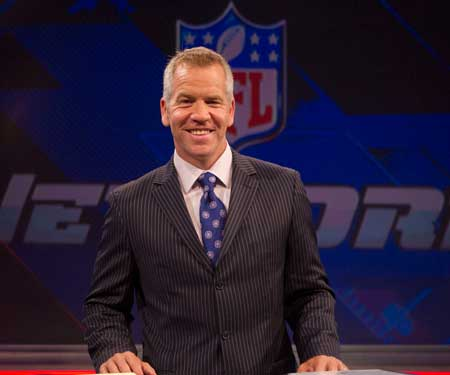
- Burmeister in 2013

No. 16
- Position: Quarterback

Personal information
- Born: March 10, 1971 (age 55); Iowa City, Iowa, U.S.
- Listed height: 6 ft 2 in (1.88 m)
- Listed weight: 215 lb (98 kg)

Career information
- High school: Iowa City West
- College: Iowa
- NFL draft: 1994: undrafted

Career history
- Minnesota Vikings (1995)*
- * Offseason or practice squad member only

Paul Burmeister (born March 10, 1971) is an American sportscaster with NBC Sports and NBC Olympics, working primarily as a play-by-play voice and studio host across a wide range of platforms. Prior to his arrival at NBC in 2014, he spent a decade at NFL Network as a studio host.

Burmeister is also the radio voice of Notre Dame football, having called all home and away games since 2018 alongside former Irish All American Ryan Harris.

The former Big Ten quarterback also called football this past spring, serving as NBC's play-by-play voice for their coverage of the inaugural USFL season, working alongside Michael Robinson, Jason Garrett, Cam Jordan, and Ryan Harris

At NBC he has now worked four Olympic Games, calling play-by-play for water polo at the Summer Olympics in Rio de Janeiro and Tokyo, and ski jumping at the Winter Games in Pyeongchang and Beijing.

Hosting The Tour de France has become a staple for him as well. Every summer Burmeister anchors NBC's coverage of The Tour, hosting each one since 2016.

In November 2021, NBC extended its exclusive broadcast deal with The English Premier League. Burmeister has become a part of their studio team, as a host for Premier League Live during the week, and Premier League Mornings on the weekend.

He is involved with the NFL throughout the year on a weekly basis, co-hosting a pair of podcasts: The Chris Simms Unbuttoned podcast, and The Peter King podcast. And for the last decade in early January, he has hosted and worked play-by-play for NBC's coverage of the All American Bowl, the nation's premier high school football all-star game.

During the winter he handles play-by-play duties for Atlantic 10 regular season basketball, as well as their conference tournament in March.

From 2019 through 2021, Burmeister was front and center for NBC's coverage of the Premier Lacrosse League, hosting its draft each spring, reporting from the sidelines during the season, as well as calling games from the booth.

In his time at NBC he has also hosted NHL Live, Pro Football Talk, The Dan Patrick Show, and America's Cup. He's reported for Football Night in America and from the Stanley Cup Finals, and done play-by-play for Notre Dame Football, Mountain West Conference football and basketball, Ivy League football, as well as called The Olympic Trials and national championships for luge and diving.

While at NFL Network from 2004 to 2014, Burmeister hosted the studio shows Playbook, College Football Live, NFL Total Access, NFL Gameday Scoreboard, Around the League Live, and Path to the Draft. Each January he hosted the networks’ coverage of the Senior Bowl, in addition to calling the game, and was a regular part of NFL Network's Scouting Combine coverage in February as a host and reporter.

Before being hired by NFL Network in 2004, Burmeister worked in local news, as a sports anchor and reporter for KCRG in Cedar Rapids, IA from 1998 to 2001, and KWWL in Waterloo, IA from 2001 to 2004.

Burmeister graduated from the University of Iowa in 1994 with a B.A. in communication studies, and an M.A. in higher education administration in 1997. He also played quarterback at Iowa for Hayden Fry from 1989 to 1993. His senior season in 1993 he was voted captain and MVP of the team that played in the first Alamo Bowl. He was invited to the NFL Combine and signed as a free agent with the Minnesota Vikings in 1995.

A 1989 graduate of Iowa City West High School, Burmeister was voted Mississippi Valley Conference Player of the Year in football and All State as a Senior. He also graduated as the school's all-time leading scorer in basketball, and earned three varsity letters in baseball.

== Early life ==
Burmeister was an all-state quarterback in 1988 and named Mississippi Valley Conference Player of the Year at Iowa City West High School. He was also a 3-year letterman and all-conference performer in basketball and baseball, graduating as the school's all-time leading scorer in basketball. A 1989 graduate of Iowa City West High School, Burmeister was voted Mississippi Valley Conference Player of the Year in football and All State as a senior. He also graduated as the school's all-time leading scorer in basketball, and earned three varsity letters in baseball.

== College career ==
Burmeister graduated from the University of Iowa in 1994 with a B.A. in Communication Studies, and an M.A. in Higher Education Administration in 1997. Burmeister also played quarterback for Hayden Fry from 1989 to 1993. He started the final three games of the 1992 season, and every game in 1993. Burmeister was named offensive captain prior to the 1993 season, and voted MVP at the conclusion of the season that ended with a berth in the inaugural Alamo Bowl. His senior season in 1993 he was voted Captain and MVP of the team that played in the first Alamo Bowl. He was invited to the NFL Combine and signed as a free agent with the Minnesota Vikings in 1995.

== Professional career ==
He was invited to participate in the NFL Scouting Combine, after his senior season, and in 1995 spent 5 months with the Minnesota Vikings as a free agent.

== Television career ==
=== NBC Sports ===
Burmeister has been an NFL studio host and play-by-play announcer for NBC Sports since 2011. In 2011 and 2012, Burmeister was the lead play-by-play voice for NBC Sports Network's coverage of Mountain West Conference Football, working alongside NFL Hall of Famer Rod Woodson for the 2012 season. He has also served as a reporter for Football Night in America.

=== Play By Play ===
Called play-by-play on NBC for Notre Dame vs Miami, OH last September, as well as for annual Blue-Gold Game on NBCSN the last 3 years.

Called Ivy League football and Mountain West football for family of NBC networks since 2011.

Called US Army All American Bowl on NBC each January since 2012. The Nation's premiere high school all star game always features multiple Notre Dame recruits.

Play by play for Atlantic 10 basketball last 3 years as well.

=== NBC Olympics play-by-play ===
Water Polo 2016 Rio Summer Olympics

Ski Jumping 2018 Pyeongchang Winter Olympics

Water Polo 2021 Tokyo Summer Olympics

Ski Jumping 2022 Beijing Winter Olympics

He called the Bayou Classic in New Orleans in 2011 and 2012, on NBC. Additionally, he calls the annual U.S. Army All-American Bowl, also on NBC.

His work at NBC has gone beyond football, providing play-by-play for Mountain West Conference basketball in 2012 and 2013, hosting on site MLS coverage in 2012, hosting Madden NFL 2012 Kickoff on NBC, and he hosted the Stanley Cup Final inside the hockey arena alongside Brian Boucher. Burmeister also lends his voice to NBC's track and field coverage as well as their PBC Boxing series.

Burmeister moved over to NBC Sports, full-time, from NBC Sports Network, in August 2014. In 2015, Burmeister Filled-in for Michele Tafoya during 2015 Pro Football Hall of Fame Game on NBC Sports.

=== Reporting ===
Reports for Football Night in America Sunday evenings in the fall, as well as NBC's coverage of Stanley Cup Finals

NFL Network, 2004–2014 Host and play-by-play

Hosted NFL Total Access, NFL Gameday Scoreboard, and Path to the Draft.

Play by play for Senior Bowl and East West Shrine Game.

NFL Preseason Play by play for Kansas City Chiefs broadcasts from 2012 to 2015, and Jacksonville Jaguars from 2007 to 2011.

=== NFL Network ===
In 10 seasons at NFL Network, Burmeister hosted NFL Total Access, NFL Gameday Scoreboard, Around the League Live, Path to the Draft, Playbook, College Football Scoreboard and College Football Now.

From 2007 to 2014, Burmeister served as lead anchor for NFL Network's studio draft coverage. Each year he, Mike Mayock and Charles Davis kicked off the network's pre-draft coverage at The Senior Bowl in Mobile, Alabama, in late January before moving on to the NFL Scouting Combine in Indianapolis in February. Then each day from late February through the end of the draft, he hosted"Path to the Draft" live in Los Angeles.

His play-by-play duties at NFL Network included calling The Senior Bowl and East-West Shrine Game alongside Mike Mayock and Charles Davis from 2011 - 2014. He also called The Insight Bowl in 2008 and 2009 with Mayock, and served as lead Play by Play announcer for NFL Network's "Arena Football Friday" from 2010 - 2012.

=== NFL Preseason Football ===
From 2007 - 2011 Burmeister was the preseason play-by-play voice for the Jacksonville Jaguars, working alongside Tony Boselli.

After the stint with the Jaguars, and since 2012, he has been the preseason voice for the Kansas City Chiefs, working with Trent Green.

=== Hosting ===
Paul hosted NBC's studio coverage of Tour de France for the 3rd year. He also hosts TDF and NHL Live as a Fill-In Host during the Regular Season and Playoffs.

=== KCRG and KWWL ===
Burmeister started his broadcasting career in August 1998 at KCRG-TV in Cedar Rapids, IA, working for 3 years as a reporter and sports anchor, as well as color commentator for KCRG Radio's high school football game of the week. In August 2001 he took over as Weekend Sports Director at NBC affiliate KWWL in Waterloo, Iowa. For 3 years he anchored and reported, as well as hosted KWWL's Sunday night 30 minute show "Sports Plus," alongside Chris Kolkhorst.

== Emcee ==
Beginning in 2006, and for each of the last 8 years, Burmeister has hosted The 101 Awards in Kansas City, the nation's longest standing and only award banquet dedicated solely to the NFL. In 2012, he hosted The Bronko Nagurski Awards, given to the nation's top defensive college football player, in Charlotte, NC.
