= Ashley ShahAhmadi =

American sports reporter

- Education: University of Georgia (BA)
- Occupations: Sports analyst; television personality
- Years active: 2015–present
- Known for: Charlotte Hornets sideline reporter
- Spouse: Tyler Krieger

Ashley ShahAhmadi is an American sports reporter. She formerly worked for ESPN's college football coverage since 2023, and has worked as an ESPN Radio NBA postseason reporter, covering the Minnesota/Dallas playoff series during the 2023–24 NBA season. She covered the Charlotte Hornets for six years with FanDuel Sports Network Southeast before leaving in 2024. She was replaced by Shannon Spake. She covered the Atlanta Braves as well. She is now a sideline reporter for NBC Sports' coverage of the NBA, WNBA, Major League Baseball, and college football.

== College and career ==
ShahAhmadi is a graduate of the University of Georgia. She began her broadcast journalism career in Meridian, Mississippi, as the weekend sports anchor at WTOK-TV. She then made a 100-market jump to Jackson, Mississippi, as the weekend sports anchor at WAPT-TV. She then returned to Atlanta, Georgia, to work as social media content producer and host for Fox Sports South/Southeast, then in 2018 became the reporter for the Hornets. She also was a CMT correspondent.

== Personal life ==
ShahAhmadi resides in Atlanta with her husband, retired professional baseball player Tyler Krieger, whom she married in 2023.
