= Rebecca Lowe =

British-American sports presenter (born 1980)

- Born: 11 November 1980 (age 46); Ealing, London, United Kingdom
- Citizenship: United Kingdom and United States
- Education: University of East Anglia
- Occupations: Television anchor and presenter
- Years active: 2002–present
- Spouse: Paul Buckle (m. 2013)
- Children: 1
- Parent: Chris Lowe

Rebecca Lowe (born 11 November 1980) is a British and American television presenter and anchor who works for NBC and NBC Sports. She previously worked at the BBC, Setanta Sports UK and ESPN UK. She was hired by Fox Sports for studio hosting duties of the 2026 FIFA World Cup.

== Early life and education ==
The daughter of BBC News presenter Chris Lowe, she was born in Ealing, west London, where she reportedly walked to school with footballer Peter Crouch. Lowe attended Notting Hill & Ealing High School then Mercersburg Academy in Pennsylvania, United States on an English-Speaking Union scholarship. She graduated with a 2:1 BA Honours Degree in Drama from the University of East Anglia in 2002.

== Career ==
Seeking to be an actress, after graduation she worked at Talksport while looking for an agent.

=== BBC ===
Lowe reported from a top Premier League match every Saturday for Final Score, was regularly a reporter on interviews and features for Football Focus, and was the presenter of a "Football in the Community" feature every Sunday morning on Match of the Day (all on BBC One).

She was a regular contributor to BBC Television's Match of the Day 2 and Grandstand. She was also one of the main sports presenters on BBC News 24 and BBC Radio 5 Live, and has additionally broadcast sports news for BBC Breakfast, BBC Radio 1, 2 and 4.

Lowe worked as BBC One's England-team reporter during the UEFA Women's Euro 2005, and was a reporter for BBC Two at the 2004 African Cup of Nations in Tunisia. She also performed the role of pitch-side reporter at the FA Women's Cup Final in 2003, 2004 and 2005, which was shown live on BBC One. Lowe reported from the 2006 FIFA World Cup in Germany.

=== Setanta Sports ===
It was announced on 28 June 2007 that Lowe would leave the BBC to join Setanta Sports as a football presenter and reporter. She co-hosted Setanta's coverage of the Football Conference as well as reporting on the Premier League and co-presenting Football Matters, Setanta's Monday-night football discussion and review show, alongside James Richardson.

=== ESPN ===
After the demise of Setanta, it was announced in July 2009, that she had joined ESPN's new UK sports channel, to co-host their new Premier League football coverage, alongside Ray Stubbs, who joined ESPN from the BBC. At ESPN, she became the first woman in the UK to host the FA Cup Final, presenting a seven-hour broadcast pitch side from the 2012 FA Cup Final between Chelsea and Liverpool.

She was also there for ESPN when the Bolton Wanderers midfielder Fabrice Muamba collapsed on the pitch at White Hart Lane during an FA Cup quarter-final in March 2012. She co-hosted the network's telecasts of the 2011 FIFA Women's World Cup alongside Bob Ley.

In January 2011, she hosted the FA Cup third-round game between Arsenal and Leeds United with Robbie Savage and Martin Keown. At half time, Savage was showered with hot dogs and coins by Leeds fans, while Lowe was subjected to constant verbal abuse and sexually charged chants. In June 2012, she appeared on US television as co-host of ESPN's U.S. coverage of UEFA Euro 2012. Lowe also sporadically presented ESPN USA's Premier League coverage.

=== NBC Sports ===
On 26 March 2013, NBC Sports hired Lowe to serve as the lead studio host for its coverage of the Premier League in the United States, beginning in the 2013–14 season. In December 2013, Lowe was named Newcomer of the Year by Sports Illustrated in its annual Media Awards. NBC later renewed her contract with the network through 2022 and 2028. Lowe is also the daytime host at NBC for all coverage of both Summer and Winter Olympic Games. She has fronted Sochi 2014, Rio 2016, Pyeong Chang 2018, Tokyo 2020, Beijing 2022, Paris 2024 and Milan-Cortina 2026.

In August 2026, Lowe featured as a recurring character in season four of Ted Lasso, where Lowe is a commentator alongside former England Lioness Jill Scott. This was Lowe's first Ted Lasso appearance after starring in an NBC promo for the Premier League with Jason Sudeikis.

=== Fox Sports ===
In December 2025, Lowe was hired by Fox Sports to serve as a studio host for its coverage of the 2026 FIFA World Cup.

== Personal life ==
On 22 December 2008, while presenting Football Matters, Lowe confirmed she is an avid supporter of Crystal Palace. She has confirmed this in several appearances with the Men in Blazers.

On 9 March 2022, Lowe announced via her Instagram account that both she and her husband had become naturalized American citizens, while retaining their British citizenship. In May 2026, it was reported that the couple had sold their 8-acre (3.2 ha) estate in El Dorado Hills near Sacramento, California.
