= John Fanta =

American sportscaster (born 1995)

- Born: 1995 (age 30–31); Cleveland, Ohio, U.S.
- Education: Seton Hall University
- Occupation: Sportscaster
- Employers: Fox Sports (2017–2025); NBC Sports (2025–present)

John Fanta (born 1995) is an American sportscaster. He is a play-by-play broadcaster for NBC Sports, calling primarily college basketball games for the Big East Conference, as well as the Big Ten Conference and the Big 12 Conference, and the National Basketball Association. He has previously been a commentator and reporter at Fox Sports and the Big East Network.

== Early life and education ==
Fanta was born in 1995 in Cleveland, Ohio. Fanta graduated from Seton Hall University College of Communications in 2017.

He began broadcasting games his freshman year in high school at Saint Ignatius High School (Cleveland). He estimates that he commentated between 250 to 300 games while in high school.

At Seton Hall, Fanta commentated games for the Pirates Sports Network (PSN). He also worked at the college's radio station, for which he was presented with the Distinguished Young Alumnus Award in 2023.

== Career ==
Upon graduating from Seton Hall University in 2017, Fanta became a play-by-play broadcaster for Fox Sports (where he interned in college). He has been a Big East college basketball commentator since 2017. With Fox and FS1, Fanta served as play-by-play announcer on several televised finals broadcasts for PBA Tour bowling during the 2024 and 2025 seasons, working alongside analyst Randy Pedersen.

Later in 2025, Fanta moved to NBC Sports. At NBC, he primarily covers Big East Conference college basketball games, but he also commentates college basketball games for the Big Ten Conference and the Big 12 Conference, in addition to covering the National Basketball Association. He primarily serves as the lead play-by-play commentator for the Big East, but also acts as a studio reporter for Big Ten basketball games and Notre Dame football games.

He called his first NBA on NBC game along with Jamal Crawford and Grant Liffmann, in February 2026.

Fanta also has a college basketball presence on the internet. He has podcasts of the Field of 68 college basketball network. He previously hosted Big East Shootaround on the Big East Digital Network.

In 2024, Fanta was honored with the U.S. Basketball Writers Association Rising Star Award for college basketball.
