= Kathryn Tappen =

American sportscaster

- Education: Rutgers University
- Occupation: Sportscaster
- Spouse: Jay Leach (m. 2009; div. 2014)

Kathryn Tappen is an American sportscaster. Tappen works on NBC Sports Group's coverage of the Notre Dame Football, Football Night in America, NHL Network's NHL Now, Golf, as well as the Summer and Winter Olympic Games among others.

== Early life and education ==
Growing up, Tappen played youth baseball and basketball on boys' teams because there were no teams for girls where she lived. She also played golf, tennis and ran cross country. In her senior year of high school at Villa Walsh Academy, Tappen focused exclusively on track and eventually received academic and athletic scholarships to attend Rutgers University.

At Rutgers, Tappen majored in journalism and was a member of the cross-country and track teams until graduating in 2003. She was a four-time Academic All-American and Big East All Star as a Scarlet Knight.

== Career ==
After starting at College Sports Television, Tappen joined WJAR in Providence, R.I., where she served as both a weekend anchor and weekday sports reporter. From there she moved to New England Sports Network (NESN). Tappen then joined the NHL Network in 2011 where she hosted NHL Tonight, and subsequently moved to NBC in the summer of 2014.

In 2014, Tappen won the "Woman of Inspiration" award presented by the Boston Chapter of Women in Sports and Events. She has been nominated for two New England Emmy Awards for sports reporting and won an Associated Press award in 2006 for her feature Swim Meet.

== Personal life ==
Tappen married former NHL defenseman and coach Jay Leach in July 2009.
