= Thomas Jefferson High School (New Jersey) =

Defunct high school in Union County, New Jersey, United States

Location
- 641 South Street; Elizabeth, Union County, New Jersey 07202; United States; 40.6572°N 74.2149°W

Information
- Type: Public high school
- Established: 1928
- Closed: 1977
- School district: Elizabeth Public Schools
- Grades: 9-12

Thomas Jefferson High School was an all-boys public high school in Elizabeth, in Union County, in the U.S. state of New Jersey, which operated as part of the Elizabeth Public Schools. When the school opened in 1929, Battin High School became an all-girls school. The school operated on a single-sex basis for 48 years until the end of the 1976–77 school year, ending its status as one half of the state's only pair of public high schools operated separately for male and female students.

In 1977, district officials stated that the inability to determine attendance zones for the two comprehensive high schools after Thomas Jefferson High School opened in 1929 combined with the expansive shop facilities in the new building, led the district to decide to split students by sex, with girls at Battin and boys at Thomas Jefferson.

The school closed at the end of the 1976–77 school year, after the Elizabeth High School complex was completed and all of the district's students, male and female, were accommodated at the new four-building facility, ending the city's status as "the only community in the state with separate public high schools for boys and girls". The $29.3 million project included renovations to Thomas Jefferson High School, which was integrated into the new complex. The Battin High School building, together with the four existing junior high schools, was repurposed as a middle school for grades six through eight.

The building now hosts the Admiral William Halsey Leadership Academy and the John E. Dwyer Technology Academy.

== Athletics ==
The boys' basketball team won the Group IV state championship in 1931 (against runner-up Neptune High School in the finals of the playoffs), 1946 (vs. Central High School of Newark), 1952 (vs. Emerson High School of Union City) and 1954 (vs. Bloomfield High School). The 1931 team won the state title in Class A (since recategorized as Group IV) with a 28-19 victory against Neptune in the tournament final. In the 1952 playoff finals, the team defeated Emerson High School of Union City by a score of 72-59 to win the Group IV title. The 1954 team defeated Bloomfield by a score of 59-46 in the Group IV final at the Elizabeth Armory.

== Notable alumni ==
- Ed Beach (1929–1996), basketball player who played in the NBA for the Minneapolis Lakers and Tri-Cities Blackhawks
- Frank Bruggy (1891–1959), catcher who played five MLB seasons
- Gil Chapman (born 1953, class of 1970), punt and kickoff return specialist for the New Orleans Saints during the 1975 NFL season
- Harry Devlin (1918–2001), artist and painter who also worked as a cartoonist for magazines such as Collier's
- Drew Esocoff (born c. 1957, class of 1975), television sports director, who has been the director of NBC Sunday Night Football
- Ron Freeman (born 1947, class of 1965), 1968 Summer Olympics, gold medalist in the 4×400 m relay, bronze medalist in the 400 meters
- George Gross (1941–2010), American football defensive tackle who played in the American Football League for the San Diego Chargers
- Don Harris (born 1954), former American football safety who played in the NFL for the Washington Redskins and the New York Giants
- Michael Kasha (1920–2013), physical chemist and molecular spectroscopist
- James M. McGowan (1920–2004), politician who served three terms in the New Jersey General Assembly from 1957 to 1963
- Dan O'Brien Sr. (1929–2017), front office executive who served as the general manager of three Major League Baseball teams
- Frederic Remington (1929–2016), politician who served in the New Jersey General Assembly from 1978 to 1982
- Sidney M. Schreiber (1914–2009), lawyer who served as an associate justice of the New Jersey Supreme Court from 1975 to 1984
- John Shumate (born 1952), retired professional basketball player and coach who played five seasons in the NBA
- Gus Stavros (1925–2022), businessman and philanthropist
- General John W. Vogt Jr. (1920–2010), flying ace of the United States Army Air Forces in World War II who served as a general in the United States Air Force during the Cold War era
- Bob Ward (1927–2005), gridiron football coach and player
- Alfred M. Wolin (born 1932), former United States district judge of the United States District Court for the District of New Jersey
- Jake Wood (born 1937), professional baseball player who played seven MLB seasons with the Detroit Tigers (1961–1967) and the Cincinnati Reds (1967), primarily as a second baseman
- Richard Wood (born 1953), former linebacker who played for the New York Jets and Tampa Bay Buccaneers of the National Football League
