= Elizabeth High School (New Jersey) =

High school in Union County, New Jersey, US

Location
- 40 Morrell Street; Elizabeth, Union County, New Jersey 07203; United States; 40.660085°N 74.21391°W

Information
- Type: Public high school
- School district: Elizabeth Public Schools
- NCES School ID: 340459005478
- Principal: Michael Cummings
- Faculty: 70.0 FTEs
- Grades: 9-12
- Enrollment: 1,268 (as of 2024–25)
- Student to teacher ratio: 18.1:1
- Colors: Scarlet; Black and white
- Athletics conference: Union County Interscholastic Athletic Conference (general); Big Central Football Conference (football)
- Team name: Minutemen
- Rival: Alexander Hamilton Preparatory Academy
- Accreditation: Middle States Association of Colleges and Schools
- Website: cicarell.epsnj.org

Elizabeth High School - Frank J. Cicarell Academy (commonly known as Elizabeth High School), is a four-year public high school located in Elizabeth, in Union County, in the U.S. state of New Jersey, serving students in ninth through twelfth grades as part of the Elizabeth Public Schools. In 2009, the school and its more than 5,000 students was split into six separate houses, each operating as an independent school with its own principal and subject of focus, including one which has retained the Elizabeth High School name. The school has been accredited by the Middle States Association of Colleges and Schools Commission on Elementary and Secondary Schools since 1978.

As of the 2024–25 school year, the school had an enrollment of 1,268 students and 70.0 classroom teachers (on an FTE basis), for a student–teacher ratio of 18.1:1. There were 799 students (63.0% of enrollment) eligible for free lunch and 175 (13.8% of students) eligible for reduced-cost lunch.

Starting in the 2016–17 school year, both upper and lower academies of Elizabeth High School merged into the newly built Frank J. Cicarell Academy, which is located next to the Thomas Jefferson Arts Academy. A couple of years later, the Thomas Jefferson Arts Academy annex for freshman students merged into the Frank J. Cicarell Academy. The building currently holds Jefferson Freshman as well as Cicarell, sophomores, juniors and senior students. The Frank J Cicarell Students, have their own new annex that just opened up only for Cicarell Freshman.

== Awards, recognition and rankings ==
In 2015, Elizabeth High School was one of 15 schools in New Jersey, and one of nine public schools, recognized as a National Blue Ribbon School in the exemplary high performing category by the United States Department of Education.

In its 2013 report on "America's Best High Schools", The Daily Beast ranked the school 320th in the nation among participating public high schools and 25th among schools in New Jersey. The school was ranked 217th in the nation and 18th in New Jersey on the list of "America's Best High Schools 2012" prepared by The Daily Beast / Newsweek, with rankings based primarily on graduation rate, matriculation rate for college and number of Advanced Placement / International Baccalaureate courses taken per student, with lesser factors based on average scores on the SAT / ACT, average AP/IB scores and the number of AP/IB courses available to students.

The school was the 119th-ranked public high school in New Jersey out of 339 schools statewide in New Jersey Monthly magazine's September 2014 cover story on the state's "Top Public High Schools", using a new ranking methodology. The school had been ranked 148th in the state of 328 schools in 2012, after being ranked 294th in 2010 out of 322 schools listed based on school statistics prior to the split. The school had been ranked 302nd in 2008 out of 316 schools. The school was ranked 287th in the magazine's September 2006 issue, which surveyed 316 schools across the state.

Following the split, Schooldigger.com ranked the school 21st out of 381 public high schools statewide in its 2011 rankings (a decrease of 8 positions from the 2010 ranking) which were based on the combined percentage of students classified as proficient or above proficient on the mathematics (97.5%) and language arts literacy (100.0%) components of the High School Proficiency Assessment (HSPA).

== History ==
The all-girls Battin High School and all-boys Thomas Jefferson High School were both closed at the end of the 1976–77 school year, after the Elizabeth High School complex was completed and all of the district's students, male and female, were accommodated at the new four-building facility, ending the city's status as "the only community in the state with separate public high schools for boys and girls". The $29.3 million project included renovations to Thomas Jefferson High School, which was integrated into the new complex. The Battin High School building, together with the four existing junior high schools, was repurposed as a middle school for grades six through eight. The building was the former location of "Breidt Brewing Company", which was established in 1882 and operated until Prohibition.

With over 5,279 students, Elizabeth High School had been the largest high school in the nation in terms of student population. Prior to 2010, Elizabeth High School occupied eight campuses, also known as houses: The William F. Halsey house, the John E. Dwyer house, the Thomas Jefferson house, the Thomas Edison house, the Sam E. Aboff house, the Alexander Hamilton academy, the Upper academy, and the Lower academy. In 2009, the Elizabeth Board of Education passed the "Transformation Plan", which split-up the houses that made up Elizabeth High School and made each house its own high school. The Upper and Lower academies became the new Elizabeth High School.

Almost half of each graduating class had failed to pass the standard High School Proficiency Assessment and complete required course credits, so they are funneled through a so-called Alternative High School Assessment test. About one in four students who entered the high school dropped out.

== Houses ==
Elizabeth High School comprised the following nine houses (or campuses) until 2009, plus an administration building, and an indoor sports center:

- Peter B. Gold Administration Building
- Thomas Dunn Sports Center
- William F. Halsey House
- John Dwyer House
- Thomas Jefferson House
- Thomas A. Edison Vocational and Technical Academy
- Alexander Hamilton Preparatory Academy
- Frank J. Cicarell Academy
- J Christian Bollwage Academy of Finance

=== Main Complex ===
Halsey House, Dwyer House, the Peter B. Gold Administration Building and Thomas Dunn Sports Center share one large building, forming the Main Complex of Elizabeth High School, most commonly known as "The Main". The Main Complex holds more students, teachers, and administrators than the other houses/campuses in the city. The Main Complex was known as the heart of Elizabeth High School.

The Main Complex is where all the Elizabeth High School extracurricular activities and sports teams are found. The building functions as a hub central as other students from the other Elizabeth High School houses come here during the after school hours. The Main Complex also holds Elizabeth High School's swimming pool where the swim team practices and meets are held. The Main Complex campus is also famous in the student body for holding a unique courtyard, being the only campus in Elizabeth High School to have one accessible to its students.

=== Thomas Jefferson House ===
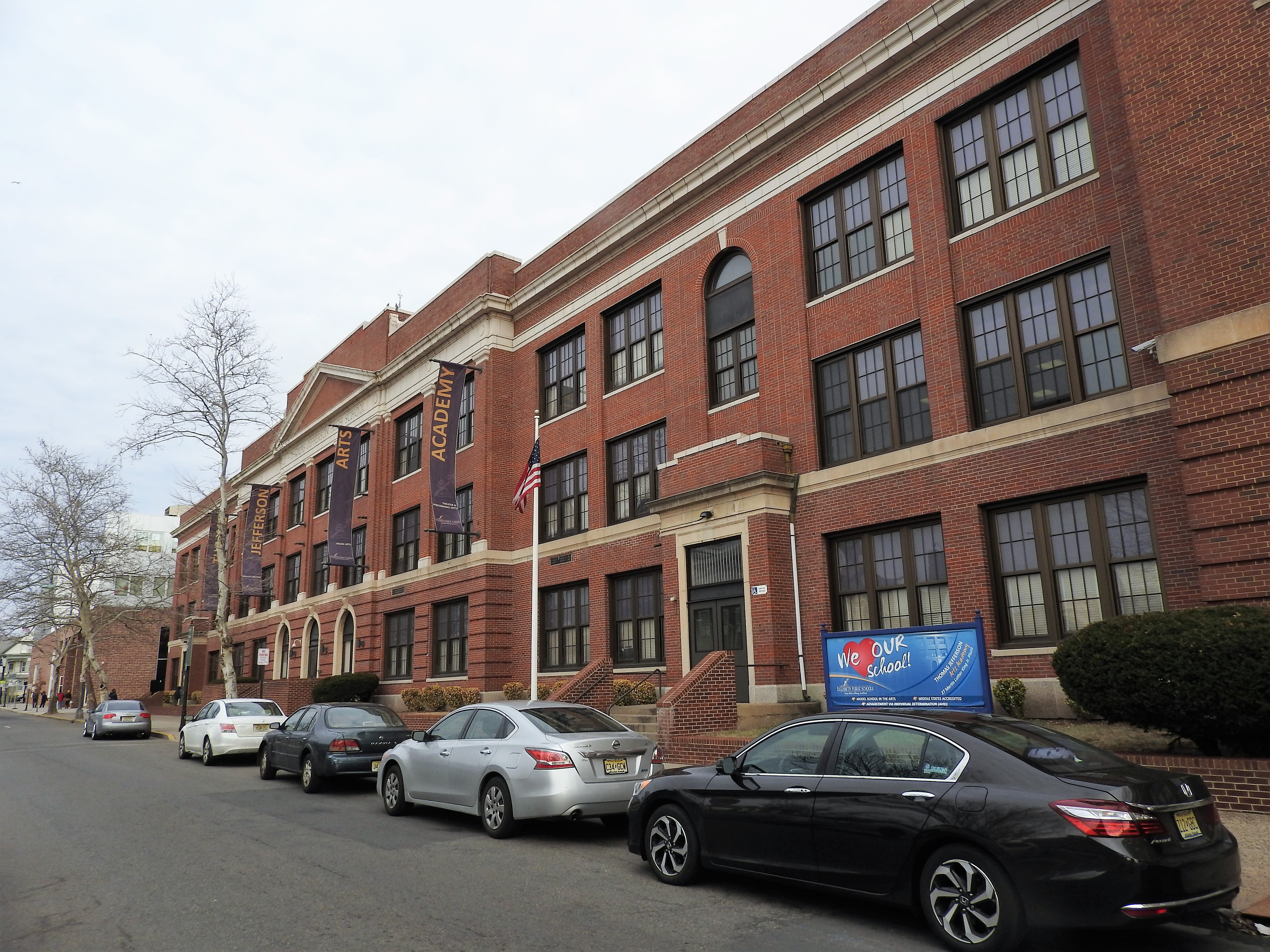
Jefferson

Located across the street from City Hall and war monuments, Thomas Jefferson House was the school's oldest house. Built in 1928 as an all-boys high school and named for the author of the Declaration of Independence and third president of the United States, Jefferson was now a house of Elizabeth High School and the center for the district's visual and performing arts programs. This house was just a short walk away from The Main Complex campus.

Jefferson specializes teaching its students in visual arts, such as drawing, painting, and creative crafts; as well as performing arts such as dance, acting, and singing. And also extra subjects, including creative writing.

=== Thomas A. Edison Academy For Career & Technical Education ===
Thomas A. Edison Academy For Career & Technical Education was originally built as Thomas Edison High School in 1935, and the last graduating class of the high school was in 1987. Named for the great inventor who worked on many of his major contributions to the scientific and commercial world right here in New Jersey. The Thomas A. Edison Academy For Career & Technical Education was the center for vocational and technical education in the city.

Williams Field, which holds the school's football field and outdoor track and field, is adjacent to the Thomas A. Edison Academy.

=== J Christian Bollwage Academy of Finance ===
The Sam E. Aboff Alternative House was the Elizabeth High School's smallest house in terms of both population and area. It was home to troublesome students and students who are excessively absent and/or tardy. It was located less than 100 yards from the Main Complex.

In 2009, each Elizabeth High School "House" was reformed into its own high school academy. The Sam E. Aboff House became the Halsey Academy of Finance (AOF), a branch of The Admiral William F. Halsey Jr. Leadership Academy. AOF is the location of the Halsey Business Leadership Strand. The Halsey Academy of Finance can house a total of 200 students and all four grade levels of Business Leadership students.

Halsey Academy of Finance is part of the National Academy Foundation (NAF). A number of the city's high schools have gone through the NAF's development process and received permission to establish NAF academies within their base schools. NAF academies work with local businesses and higher education institutions to prepare students for careers in fields such as technology, engineering, business and finance and hospitality. The NAF curriculum engages students through a series of career exploration courses, mentorships, internships, and many opportunities for off-campus extended classroom experiences to give the participating students a better idea of the opportunities available to them in terms of further education and career fields. All NAF courses use project-based learning techniques with an emphasis on strengthening literacy. Halsey Academy established the NAF Halsey Academy of Finance on a campus directly across the street from the main Halsey building.

Starting in the 2016–2017 school year, the Academy of Finance spun-off from Halsey and it became its own school, moving to the former location of Upper Academy, which was formerly part of Elizabeth High School

=== Frank J. Cicarell Academy/Upper and Lower Academy ===
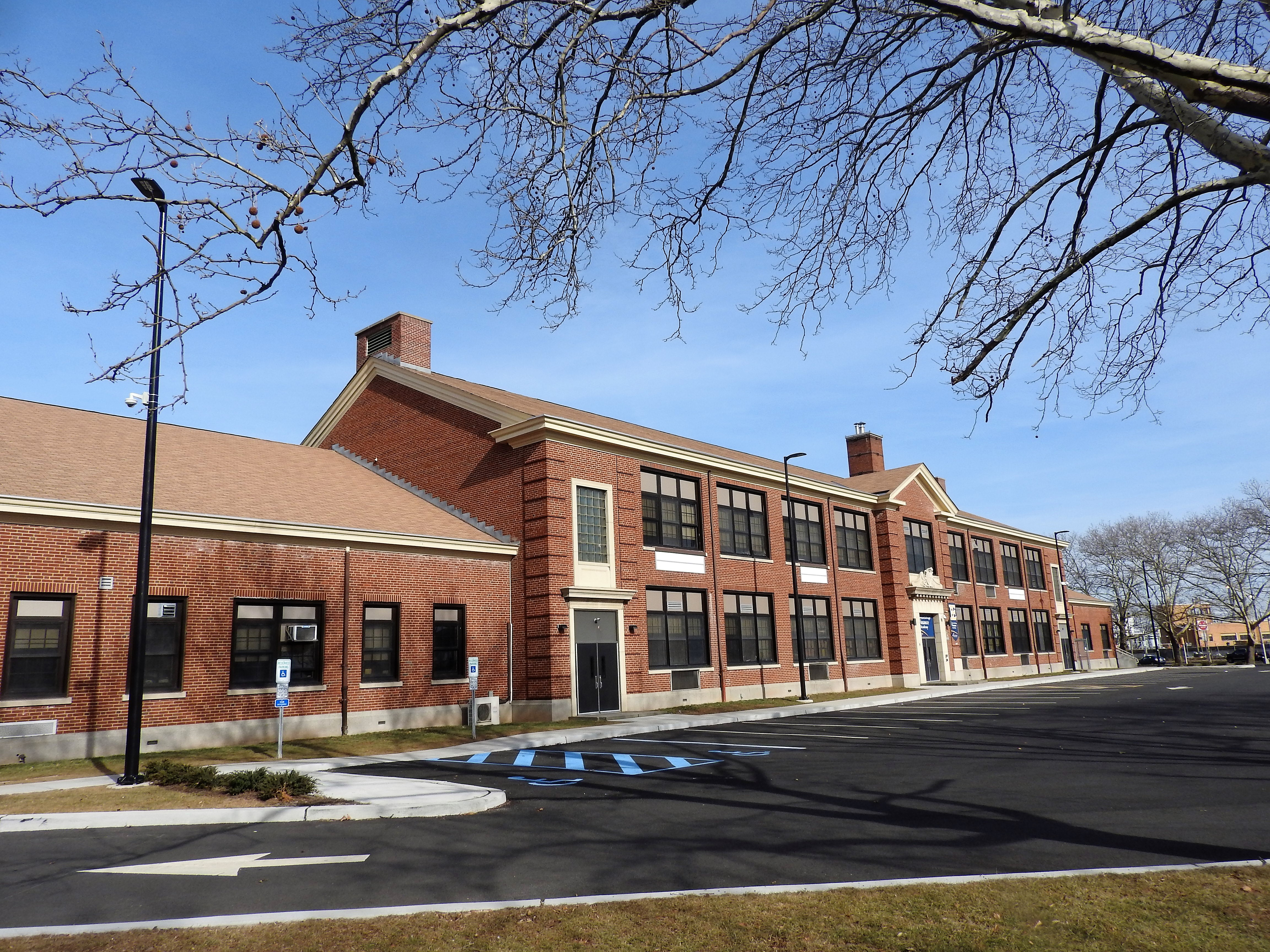
Former Upper academy building

The Upper and Lower Academies which are known as "Elizabeth High School" were established in 2006 with a curriculum that prepares students for four-year colleges. The Upper Academy building held 10th–12th grade students (upper classmen), while the Lower Academy building holds 9th graders (lower classmen). Students enrolling in these academies are encouraged to take honors and Advanced Placement-level courses. Students are required to wear school uniforms and must maintain at least a 3.0 grade point average to enroll or continue to stay in The Upper and Lower Academies.

In the 2012 "Ranking America's High Schools" issue by The Washington Post, the school was ranked 2nd in New Jersey and 79th nationwide.

In September 2016, Elizabeth High School moved into the newly constructed Frank J. Cicarell Academy, named after the Physical Education teacher who worked for the Elizabeth Public Schools and died in 2007. The location of the new high school, is located directly next to the Jefferson Arts academy. The former location of Upper Academy became the Academy of Finance, The Lower Academy is used as the Thomas Edison Academy's Annex.

In July 2021, it was decided that there would be a new Lower Academy for the upcoming 2021-22 school year at the former location of St. Genevieve School. The building would open to students on September 14, 2021, after Hurricane Ida delayed the opening.

=== Alexander Hamilton Preparatory Academy ===
Alexander Hamilton Preparatory Academy sign being placed in early 2008.

Alexander Hamilton Preparatory Academy was the newest house in Elizabeth High School, accommodating lower and upper classmen, bringing a total of eight houses in Elizabeth High School, serving the largest high school population in the United States.

Alexander Hamilton Preparatory Academy integrates a curriculum with the philosophies of the Advancement Via Individual Determination (AVID) program.

AVID is a research-based instructional model that encourages students to prepare for and participate in a challenging college preparatory curriculum. In addition to enrolling in honors and AP level courses, students will receive academic support through a specially designed AVID elective taught by AVID-trained instructors. The rigorous curriculum prepares students for four-year colleges. Students are required to wear school uniforms during school hours.

Each student needs to establish and maintain at least a 2.0 Grade point average to enroll or continue to stay in Alexander Hamilton Preparatory Academy.

Alexander Hamilton Preparatory Academy's campus is the farthest one from Elizabeth High School's Main Complex. It is located next to Westfield Avenue, close to the borders of other towns. Hamilton Preparatory is the only house in which students must walk outside to classes. They are held in a small separate one-story adjacent building known as "The Portables", which is only a few yards away from the student cafeteria back door entrance and the main teachers' parking lot.

Hamilton became the 46th best high school in New Jersey by US News in 2012

== Transformation plan ==
From 1979 to 2009, Elizabeth High School was one big high school with eight campuses (or houses). In 2009, the Elizabeth Board of Education passed the "Transformation Plan" that split-up the high school and created six smaller high schools.

- The Upper Academy and Lower Academy became the new Elizabeth High School-Frank J. Cicarell Academy
- The William F. Halsey House became Admiral William F. Halsey Jr. Leadership Academy
- The John Dwyer House became John E. Dwyer Technology Academy
- The Thomas Jefferson House became Thomas Jefferson Arts Academy
- The Sam E. Aboff Alternative House became part of Admiral William F. Halsey Jr. Leadership Academy
- The Thomas A. Edison Vocational and Technical Academy stood the same
- The Alexander Hamilton Preparatory Academy stood the same

In 2016, the Board of Education made some additional changes.

- Elizabeth High School, which had two different locations for 9th grade students and all other students, became one location by moving into the Frank J. Cicarell Academy, located next to the Jefferson Arts Academy. The Academy of Finance, which was part of the Halsey Leadership Academy spun-off and became its own School (J. Christian Bollwage Finance Academy), moving into the former location of Upper Academy. The Admiral William F. Halsey Jr. Leadership Academy was later renamed into The Admiral William F. Halsey Jr. Health and Public Safety Academy. The Thomas A. Edison Vocational and Technical Academy was renamed into The Thomas A. Edison Career and Technical Academy.

== Marching band ==
The Elizabeth High School Marching Band won the USBands State and National 5A Competition in 2011, 2012, and 2013. In the 2014 season, the Marching Band moved up from 5A to 5 Open and went undefeated until their streak was snapped placing 4th in the National 5 Open Championship in MetLife Stadium on November 15, 2014. Throughout the week of Super Bowl XLVIII between the Seattle Seahawks and Denver Broncos, the Elizabeth High School Marching Band was invited to perform at Media Day in the Prudential Center in Newark, New Jersey as well as perform in pre-game festivities at the Super Bowl at MetLife Stadium. In 2019 the band took first at the USBands New Jersey State Championship and The New Jersey Regional Championship. Marking their first championship titles in open class division. As well as becoming a finalist at the Bands of America Mid-Atlantic Regional Championship placing 6th out of 26 schools.

In 2021 the band competed in the inaugural New Jersey Marching Band Director’s Association State Championship and placed first in Class AAA, with a score of 93.7.

Year	Marching Band Show	States	BOA Mid-Atlantic	Atlantic Coast	NJ Regional	Nationals	Top Score
2011	Santana	1st				1st	97.417
2012	Tango	1st				1st	97.100
2013	Descarga Cubana	1st				1st	95.987
2014	Rituals		11th			4th	97.125
2015	Enigma	2nd	9th			9th	93.513
2016	Bird's Eye View	4th	20th			10th	92.075
2017	Sol Invictus	4th		9th			92.225
2018	Celebra La Vida	2nd	11th				94.875
2019	The Heist	1st	6th		1st		95.850
2020	We Will Never Disappoint						90.33
2021	What We Love	1st					93.70
2022	Arachnidium	3rd			10th	12th	89.800
2023	Immortal Masquerade	4th			13th	9th	88.350
2024	Beyond the Sea						
2025	Carme(noir)						

=== Indoor percussion ===
As of 2023, the Elizabeth High School Marching Band has participated in USBands competitions as a part of its Indoor Percussion Program. In 2025, Elizabeth High School Indoor Percussion participated in another competitive circuit known as WGI. The ensemble has become champions since its inception, three years in a row.

Year	Indoor percussion show	USBands finals	USBands result	WGI prelims	WGI finals
2023	The Gift	April 15, 2023	Scholastic Standstill A Champions	N/A	N/A
2024	Beyond Binary	April 13, 2024	Scholastic Marching A Champions	N/A	N/A
2025	The Other Me	April 5, 2025	Scholastic Marching A Champions	8th	6th

== Athletics ==
The Elizabeth High School Minutemen compete in the Union County Interscholastic Athletic Conference, which is comprised of public and private high schools in Union County and was established following a reorganization of sports leagues in Northern New Jersey by the New Jersey State Interscholastic Athletic Association. Prior to the 2010 reorganization, the school had competed in the Watchung Conference, which consisted of public and private high schools in Essex County, Hudson County and Union County in northern New Jersey. With 5,049 students in grades 10-12, the school was classified by the NJSIAA for the 2019–20 school year as Group IV for most athletic competition purposes, which included schools with an enrollment of 1,060 to 5,049 students in that grade range. The football team competes in Division 5A of the Big Central Football Conference, which includes 60 public and private high schools in Hunterdon, Middlesex, Somerset, Union and Warren counties, which are broken down into 10 divisions by size and location. The school was classified by the NJSIAA as Group V North for football for 2024–2026, which included schools with 1,317 to 5,409 students.

The boys indoor track team won the all-group state title in 1952 as co-champion with Thomas Jefferson High School.

The football team won the North II Group IV state sectional championships in 1981, 1988, 1989, 1997, 1999, 2000 and 2006, and won the North II Group V state sectional title in 2012. The 1988 team finished the season with a 10–1 record after winning the North II Group IV state sectional title with a 13–12 victory against Morris Knolls High School in the championship game. The team won the 1999 North II, Group IV sectional championship with a 26–14 win over Montclair High School. In a season in which the team had six shut outs and gave up 61 points, the 2000 team won the North II Group IV title with a 13–7 win in the championship game, their second consecutive title won against Montclair as its opponent in the finals. The football team won the 2006 North II Group IV sectional championship, defeating Phillipsburg High School by a score of 14–9 in the tournament final. The 2012 team finished the season with a 11–0 record after winning the North II Group V state sectional title with a 37–33 win against Piscataway High School in the tournament final.

The baseball team won the Group IV state championship in 1983 (defeating Middletown High School North in the tournament final), 1986 (vs. Shawnee High School) and 1994 (vs. Howell High School). The 1983 team finished the season with a 22–3 record after winning the Group IV title with a 9–4 victory against Middletown North in the championship game. The 1986 team used a five-run outburst to defeat Shwnee by a score of 8–3 in the championship game to win the Group IV state title and finish the year at 25-4-2.

The boys basketball team won the Group IV state title in 1985 (against Camden High School in the final game of the tournament), 1988 (vs. Camden), 1989 (vs. Trenton Central High School), 1990 (vs. Trenton Central) and 1991 (vs. Camden); with the group finals cancelled due to COVID-19, the team was declared the North IV regional champion in 2020. Led by Luther Wright, the team won the Tournament of Champions in 1990 with a 65–62 win against St. Anthony High School in the tournament final, with Danny Hurley missing a last-second three-pointer that would have tied the game. The team won the program's fourth consecutive Group IV title in 1990, holding off Camden and winning by a score of 76–70 in the finals. The team won the 2003 North II, Group IV title, topping Linden High School 77–72 in the final.

The boys spring / outdoor track and field team won the Group IV state championship in 1988 and 1998 (as co-champion with Millville High School).

The girls basketball team won the Group IV state championship in 1996 against Toms River High School North in the finals.

The Elizabeth High School girls rugby team, formed in 2006, won the title of Northeast Regional Champions in June 2008. They went on to become the 7th-ranked Girls U-19 rugby team in the nation.

Fall Sports	Winter Sports	Spring Sports
Football (Boys)	Indoor Track (Boys and Girls)	Outdoor Track (Boys and Girls)
Soccer (Boys and Girls)	Basketball (Boys and Girls)	Baseball (Boys)
Volleyball (Girls)	Wrestling (Boys)	Softball (Girls)
Tennis (Girls)	Swimming (Boys and Girls)	Tennis (Boys)
Cross Country (Boys and Girls)	Bowling (Boys and Girls)	Golf (Boys and Girls)
Gymnastics (Boys and Girls)		Rugby (Girls)
Marching Band (Boys and Girls)		Volleyball (Boys)

== Administration ==
The principal is Michael Cummings. His core administration team includes the three assistant principals.

== Notable alumni ==
- Asad Abdul-Khaliq (born 1980, class of 1998), former professional quarterback who played in the Arena Football League for the Chicago Rush and New York Dragons
- Rosy Bagolie, school administrator and politician who has represented the 27th legislative district in the New Jersey General Assembly since 2024
- Todd Bowles (born 1963, class of 1981), defensive coordinator of the Tampa Bay Buccaneers and former head coach of the New York Jets, who played in the NFL as a defensive back with the Washington Redskins and San Francisco 49ers
- N. J. Burkett (born 1962, class of 1980), television news correspondent for WABC-TV in New York City
- Rodney Carter (born 1964), former NFL running back / 3rd down receiver with the Pittsburgh Steelers
- Al Catanho (born 1972), former NFL linebacker for the New England Patriots and the Washington Redskins
- Karen Civil (born 1984), social media and digital media marketing strategist
- Tom Colicchio (born 1962, class of 1980), chef, CEO of Crafted Hospitality and head judge of Bravo's Top Chef
- Chris Gatling (born 1967), former all star professional basketball player for NBA teams from 1991 to 2002
- Ray Graham (born 1990), football running back
- Khaseem Greene (born 1989), NFL Linebacker for the Chicago Bears, former first team All American Linebacker during his career at Rutgers University
- Ibrahim Jaaber (born 1984), former professional basketball player
- Horace Jenkins (born 1974), former NBA player
- Norm McRae (1947-2003), former MLB pitcher who played for the Detroit Tigers
- Jerome Murphy (born 1987), current NFL American football cornerback who played college football at the University of South Florida and was drafted as the first pick in the third round by the St. Louis Rams
- Raheem Orr (born 1980), former professional football defensive end
- Alex Reyes (born 1994), MLB pitcher who made his debut in 2016 for the St. Louis Cardinals
- Jonal Saint-Dic (born 1985), former football defensive end
- Jahad Thomas (born 1995), NFL running back who played for the New York Jets and the Dallas Cowboys
- P. J. Walker (born 1995), quarterback for the Calgary Stampeders
- Luther Wright (born 1971, class of 1990), former NBA player for the Utah Jazz
