= Admiral William Halsey Leadership Academy =

High school in Union County, New Jersey, US

Admiral William F. Halsey Jr. Health and Public Safety Academy

Location
- 641 South Street; Elizabeth, Union County, New Jersey 07202; United States; 40.6580°N 74.2130°W

Information
- Other names: Halsey House (William Halsey House)
- Type: Public high school
- Motto: "There are no great men. There are only great challenges that ordinary men like you and me are forced by circumstances to meet."
- Established: 2009
- School district: Elizabeth Public Schools
- School number: School No. 83; School No. 83A (Annex)
- NCES School ID: 340459003039
- Principal: Veronica Vega
- Faculty: 87.0 FTEs
- Grades: 9-12
- Enrollment: 1,272 (as of 2024–25)
- Student to teacher ratio: 14.6:1
- Campus: Urban
- Colors: Navy Blue & Red
- Mascot: The Bulldogs
- Accreditation: Middle States Association of Colleges and Schools
- Website: halsey.epsnj.org

The Admiral William F. Halsey Jr. Health and Public Safety Academy is a four-year comprehensive public high school in Elizabeth, in Union County, in the U.S. state of New Jersey, operating as part of the Elizabeth Public Schools. The Leadership Academy shares a large building with the John Dwyer Technology Academy, the Peter B. Gold Administration Building, and the Thomas Dunn Sports Center, which together form the Main Complex. The school has been accredited by the Middle States Association of Colleges and Schools Commission on Elementary and Secondary Schools since 2013.

As of the 2024–25 school year, the school had an enrollment of 1,272 students and 87.0 classroom teachers (on an FTE basis), for a student–teacher ratio of 14.6:1. There were 918 students (72.2% of enrollment) eligible for free lunch and 118 (9.3% of students) eligible for reduced-cost lunch.

== Awards, recognition and rankings ==
The school was the 335th-ranked public high school in New Jersey out of 339 schools statewide in New Jersey Monthly magazine's September 2014 cover story on the state's "Top Public High Schools", using a new ranking methodology. The school had been ranked 311th in the state of 328 schools in 2012, after not being ranked in 2010.

== History ==
The high school was established on September 9, 2009, as the Admiral William F. Halsey Leadership Academy and the Annex as "Admiral William F. Halsey Finance Academy" (AOF). Before that, there was originally there were only two high schools in the district: Elizabeth High School and Thomas A. Edison Career and Technical Academy. Before 2009 the schools were considered as "Houses" during that time period there were five Houses: Halsey House, Dwyer House, Jefferson House, Edison House and Aboff House. Now Halsey Academy and the John E. Dwyer Technology Academy share the building otherwise known as "The Main."

Halsey Academy was named after William Halsey Jr. (1882–1959), who was an American Navy admiral during World War II. He is one of four officers to have attained the rank of five-star fleet admiral of the United States Navy.

== Curriculum ==
Students enrolled in the Admiral William F. Halsey Health & Public Safety Academy, in addition to completing a college preparatory program, also participate in programs, electives, classes, and activities that focus on the leadership development of each student. The principles of Stephen R. Covey's The Seven Habits of Highly Effective People serve as the foundation for the Halsey Leadership Academy program; peer leadership, community service, and student government activities are emphasized. Honors and advanced-placement classes are offered. School uniforms are mandated.

Each student has the opportunity to select from among the three "strands" of study offered. Students enrolling in the Military Leadership Strand participate in the school's Marine Corps Junior Reserve Officers' Training Corps. The school is one of five in the state to participate in the Marine Corps JROTC program.

Students enrolling in the Public Safety Strand participate in activities that provide them with an understanding of the responsibilities assumed by men and women who select careers in law enforcement or within the legal system, fire science, emergency management (EMT), and homeland security.

Health Sciences Strand: Preparation for careers in patient care, nursing, radiology, medical technology, and health administration. It also offers options in physical therapy, sports training, and nutrition, with clinical experiences at Trinitas Regional Medical Center.

Also, before 2016, students enrolled in the Business Leadership Strand, which was once part of the academy, participated in coursework, internships, and other activities that introduced them to the world of business and e-commerce, and helped them to develop a foundation in entrepreneurial, management, and administrative skills. Those students who followed on those skills were in 2011 moved to their own School, known as the J. Christian Bollwage Finance Academy, in Upper Academy.

Some extracurricular activities and sports teams are found in Halsey Academy. The building functions as a hub as other students from the other Elizabeth Academies and Elizabeth High School use the facility after school hours. The Main Complex also holds Elizabeth High School's swimming pool, where the swim team practices and meets are held.
