= Drew Esocoff =

American television sports director

- Born: Elizabeth, New Jersey

Drew Esocoff (born c. 1957) is an American television sports director, who as of 2006 has been the director of NBC Sunday Night Football.

== Early life ==
Esocoff was born in Elizabeth, New Jersey, graduating from Thomas Jefferson High School in 1975, later attending Colgate University. While in college he worked as a substitute teacher at Elizabeth High School where one of his students was Todd Bowles.

== Career ==
Esocoff has worked for ESPN and ABC, serving as director for Monday Night Football, SportsCenter, and the NBA Finals, as well as five Super Bowls. Since 2006, he has served as director for NBC Sunday Night Football.

As of 2024, Esocoff has won 19 Emmy Awards and in 2022 was inducted in the Sports Broadcasting Hall of Fame.
