= Battin High School =

Defunct high school in New Jersey, US

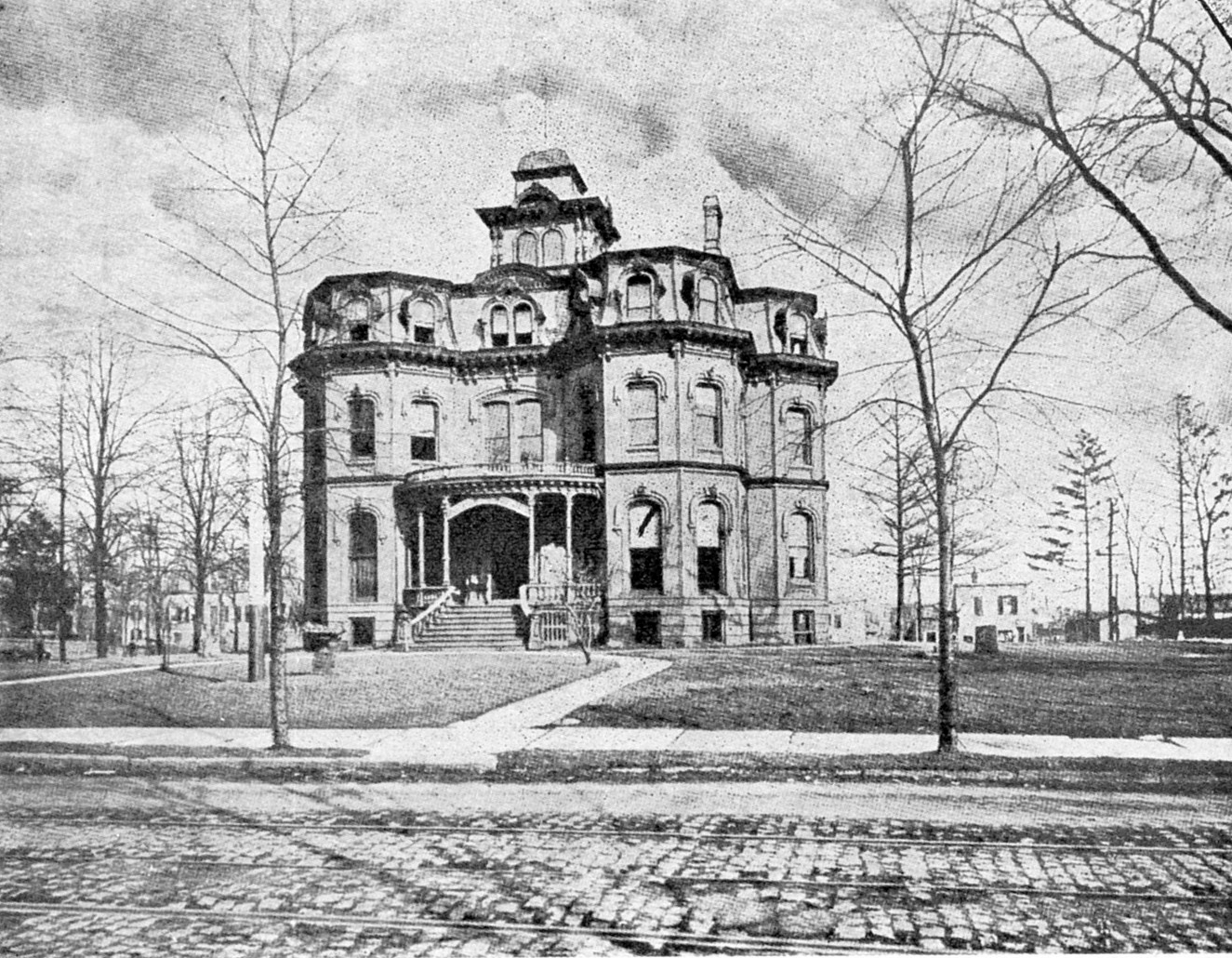

Location
- Elizabeth, New Jersey; 40.6572°N 74.2149°W

Information
- School type: Public School, Girls' school
- Established: 1889
- Closed: 1977

Battin High School was a public high school in Elizabeth, in Union County, in the U.S. state of New Jersey, which operated as part of the Elizabeth Public Schools. The school opened in 1889 as a coeducational institution. After converting to a girls-only school in 1929, it operated on a single-sex basis for 48 years until the end of the 1976–77 school year, ending its status as one half of the state's only pair of public high schools operated separately for male and female students.

== History ==
The high school dates back to 1889, when it was opened at 300 South Broad Street in a mansion that had been donated to the city that same year by Joseph Battin, president of the Elizabethtown Water Company, and namesake of the school. A building was constructed on the site in 1913.

Originally operated on a coeducational basis, the school became female only starting in 1929, after Thomas Jefferson High School was constructed and dedicated to serve male students. In 1977, district officials stated that the inability to determine attendance zones for the two comprehensive high schools after Thomas Jefferson High School opened in 1929 combined with the expansive shop facilities in the new building, led the district to decide to split students by sex, with girls at Battin and boys at Thomas Jefferson.

On January 22, 1952, a Convair 240 operated as American Airlines Flight 6780 was flying on a route initiating in Buffalo, New York, on final approach to runway 6 at Newark Airport in heavy fog conditions and crashed at 3:45 p.m., narrowly missing the high school. All 23 on board the plane (20 passengers and 3 crew) and an additional 8 people on the ground, were killed in the crash and ensuing fire, though the plane never hit the school building, as some earlier reports had indicated, and there were no students in the building at the time of the crash.

By 1972, the school was the only public high school in New Jersey operated exclusively for women, despite coeducational programs at both Princeton University and Vassar College. By that time, a policy under which pregnant students had been required to withdraw from school had been eliminated and students were allowed to return to school after giving birth and attending a special off-site program during their pregnancy. Though 40% of graduating students went on to college and district officials insisted that the curriculum was standard across the district's separate high schools, a student criticized the difference in expectations of male and female students, noting that "Boys are expected to be engineers and attorneys. Girls are supposed to be secretaries and mothers."

The school closed at the end of the 1976–77 school year, after the Elizabeth High School complex was completed and all of the district's students, male and female, were accommodated at the new four-building facility, ending the city's status as "the only community in the state with separate public high schools for boys and girls". The $29.3 million project included renovations to Thomas Jefferson High School, which was integrated into the new complex. The Battin High School building, together with the four existing junior high schools, was repurposed as a middle school for grades six through eight.

Joseph Battin School, which had been located at the site, will be demolished by July 2025 at a cost of $5.9 million as part of a project of the New Jersey Schools Development Authority with the site used for a new PreK–8 school that would accommodate 1,000 students in a 142,000 square feet (13,200 m^{2}) building that would be constructed for $96 million.

== Notable alumni ==
- Judy Blume (born 1938; class of 1956), author whose novels for children and young adults have exceeded sales of 80 million
- Fay Gillis Wells (1908–2002, class of 1925), aviator, journalist and broadcaster
- Mary C. Henderson (1928–2012), historian of theater
- Phyllis Kirk (1927–2006), actress
- Justin J. McCarthy (1900–1959), prelate of the Roman Catholic Church who served as bishop of the Diocese of Camden
- James P. Mitchell (1900–1964; class of 1917), politician who served as United States Secretary of Labor from 1953 to 1961 during the Presidency of Dwight D. Eisenhower
- James J. Norris (1907–1976; class of 1924), advocate for refugees and migrants who was the first president of the International Catholic Migration Commission
- Suzanne Shepherd (1934–2023), actress and theater director
- William Gayley Simpson (1892–1991), white nationalist and author
