= Al Catanho =

American football player (born 1972)

No. 54
- Position: Linebacker

Personal information
- Born: January 20, 1972 (age 54); Elizabeth, New Jersey, U.S.
- Listed height: 6 ft 4 in (1.93 m)
- Listed weight: 230 lb (104 kg)

Career information
- High school: Elizabeth
- College: Rutgers
- NFL draft: 1995: undrafted

Career history
- New England Patriots (1995); Washington Redskins (1996)

Alcides Catanho (born January 20, 1972) is an American former professional football player who was a linebacker in the National Football League (NFL) for the New England Patriots and the Washington Redskins. He played high school football at Elizabeth High School and college football for the Rutgers Scarlet Knights. He is married to Kara Catanho, with whom he has two children, a daughter and a son. Kara Catanho works at WWMS, a school in Edison, NJ as a health and physical education teacher.
