= Alexander Hamilton Preparatory Academy =

High school in Union County, New Jersey, US

- Alexander Hamilton Preparatory Academy sign being placed in early 2008.

Location
- 310 Cherry Street; Elizabeth, Union County, New Jersey 07208; United States; 40.6680°N 74.2217°W

Information
- Other name: AHPA
- Former names: Alexander Hamilton Junior High School No. 2 Alexander Hamilton Middle School
- School type: Public high school Preparatory High School
- Established: September 9, 2009
- Status: Opened
- School board: Elizabeth Board of Education (EBOE)
- School district: Elizabeth Public Schools
- School number: School No. 80 (Main) School No. 80A (Annex)
- School code: 80AHPA
- NCES School ID: 340459003043
- Principal: George E. Mikros
- Faculty: 63.0 FTEs
- Grades: 9-12
- Enrollment: 1,015 (as of 2024–25)
- Student to teacher ratio: 16.1:1
- Classes offered: AP College Classes | AVID (Advancement Via Individual Determination)
- Campus: Urban
- Color: Gold Navy Blue
- Slogan: "Today's Learners, Tomorrow's Leaders!"
- Mascot: Lions
- Rival: Elizabeth High School-Frank J. Cicarell Academy
- Accreditation: Middle States Association of Colleges and Schools
- USNWR ranking: 1. 419 in New Jersey
- National ranking: 1. 1,019 in US
- Website: hamilton.epsnj.org

Alexander Hamilton Preparatory Academy (abbreviated as AHPA) is a four-year comprehensive public high school located in Elizabeth, in Union County, in the U.S. state of New Jersey, operating as part of Elizabeth Public Schools. The academy accepts students in ninth through twelfth grades in Elizabeth who have passed the requirements for enrollment. The academy is operated by the Elizabeth Board of Education. The school has been accredited by the Middle States Association of Colleges and Schools Commission on Elementary and Secondary Schools since 2013. The school's college-preparatory curriculum prepares students for four-year colleges and universities.

As of the 2024–25 school year, the school had an enrollment of 1,015 students and 63.0 classroom teachers (on an FTE basis), for a student–teacher ratio of 16.1:1. There were 691 students (68.1% of enrollment) eligible for free lunch and 134 (13.2% of students) eligible for reduced-cost lunch.

== Awards, recognition and rankings ==
The school was the 46th-ranked public high school in New Jersey out of 328 schools statewide according to U.S. News & World Report.

The school was the 204th-ranked public high school in New Jersey out of 339 schools statewide in New Jersey Monthly magazine's September 2014 cover story on the state's "Top Public High Schools", using a new ranking methodology. The school was the 303rd-ranked public high school in New Jersey out of 328 schools statewide in New Jersey Monthly magazine's September 2012 cover story on the state's "Top Public High Schools", the first time that the school was included in the magazine's rankings.

== Alexander Hamilton Preparatory 9th Grade Academy (80A) ==
The Alexander Hamilton Preparatory Academy 9th Grade Academy (80A) is located at 1003 North Broad Street.

== History ==
The Alexander Hamilton Preparatory Academy was transformed into the school it is today during the summer of 2008. Alexander Hamilton Preparatory Academy was created as part of Elizabeth High School. It was a standalone school in 2009 when the school district split Elizabeth High School into six schools as a way to combat overcrowding.

== Athletics ==
The Alexander Hamilton Preparatory Academy does not have its own athletic teams.
