= National Academy Foundation School =

Location
- 540 North Caroline Street; Baltimore, Maryland 21205; United States
- Coordinates: 39°17′47″N 76°35′51″W

Information
- School type: Public, Magnet
- Motto: Be future ready
- Founded: 2002
- School district: Baltimore City Public Schools
- Superintendent: Dr. Sonja Brookins Santelises
- School number: 421
- Principal: Chevelle Lampkin
- Grades: 6-12
- Enrollment: 796 (2018)
- Area: Urban
- Colors: Green, White and Gray
- Mascot: Screamin Eagles
- Team name: Screamin Eagles/ Lady Eagles
- Website: City Schools Site

National Academy Foundation School is a public secondary school located in Baltimore, Maryland, United States. It is based on the National Academy Foundation educational design to have "small learning communities."

The school was launched in 2002 and was housed in the Port Discovery building in Downtown Baltimore. In 2004 it was moved to the first floor of Digital Harbor High School. In 2009 it moved to Dunbar Middle School to form a campus with Paul Laurence Dunbar High School. The National Academy Foundation has five different academies that students may choose to pursue, starting in their 10th grade year: Academy of Finance, Academy of Hospitality and Tourism, Academy of Information Technology, Academy of Engineering and Academy of Law. At graduation, students receive a Maryland state diploma with a certification of the academy they chose.

In 2010 National Academy Foundation adopted a middle school, National Academy Foundation prep; which is housed in the former Thomas G. Hayes elementary school building.

== Sports ==
While National Academy Foundation was housed on the first floor of Digital Harbor High School both schools combined as one team. In 2010 National Academy Foundation received its own athletics department. The football team went through the regular season undefeated but lost in the city championships to Paul Laurence Dunbar High School.

- Boys – football, basketball, baseball, lacrosse
- Girls – volleyball, basketball, softball, badminton
- Unified – track & field, tennis, swimming

== Academics ==
- Academy of Hospitality & Tourism – helps students chart career paths in one of the world's largest industries, from hotel management to sports, entertainment, and event management, and includes the study of geography, economics, and world cultures.
- Academy of Finance – connects high school students with the world of financial services, offering a curriculum that covers banking and credit, financial planning, international finance, securities, insurance, accounting, and economics.
- Academy of Information Technology – prepares students for career opportunities in programming, database administration, web design and administration, digital networks, and other areas in the expanding digital workplace.
- Academy of Engineering – answers an acute need for engineers in this country by educating high school students in the principles of engineering and providing content in the fields of electronics, biotech, aerospace, civil engineering, and architecture.
- Academy of Law & Leadership – are high school career pathways that introduce youth to law and policy-related professions while preparing them to be problem solvers, active citizens, and community leaders. LLA's feature a Maryland State Department of Education-approved curriculum emphasizing core academic skills and critical thinking in and out of the classroom.
