= N. J. Burkett =

American TV news correspondent (born 1962)

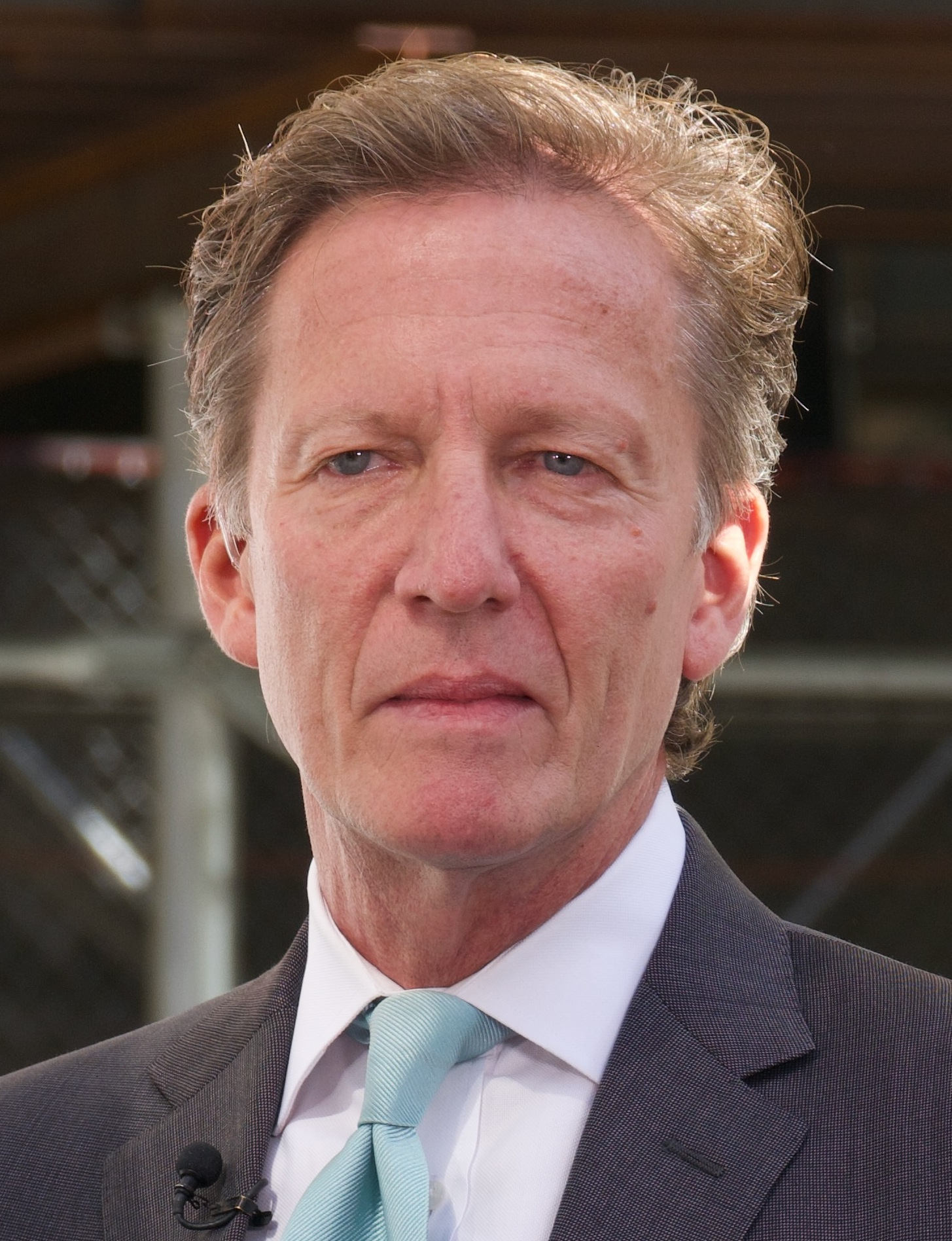
- Burkett in 2024
- Born: Newton Jones Burkett, III; May 6, 1962 (age 64); New Jersey, United States
- Education: Columbia University
- Occupation: Television journalist
- Years active: 1986–present
- Known for: Coverage of the September 11 attacks
- Parents: Newton Jones Burkett Jr; Barbara Burkett

Newton Jones Burkett, III (born May 6, 1962), known as N.J. Burkett, is an American broadcast journalist. Since July 1989 he has served as a correspondent for Eyewitness News on WABC-TV in New York City. Burkett is noted for his live coverage of the collapse of the World Trade Center during the September 11 attacks of 2001.

== Early life and education ==
Burkett was born to Newton Jones Burkett Jr. and Barbara Burkett. He grew up in Elizabeth, New Jersey. He has explained that the use of the initials "N.J." was encouraged by his agent and a station president to make him seem less "aristocratic", and not a tribute to his home state. He graduated from Elizabeth High School in 1980 and attended Columbia University. He holds a BA in Political Science and a master's degree in International Affairs, both from Columbia University.

== Career ==
Burkett previously worked at WFSB in Hartford, Connecticut (which also uses the Eyewitness News branding for their newscasts), where he had been a reporter since 1986.

At WABC-TV, Burkett is best known for his coverage of the World Trade Center attacks of September 11, 2001. He was located across from the plaza, about a block away, and was reporting after the hijacked aircraft had crashed into the buildings, and first responders were clustered in the surrounding area. Burkett's camera operator, Marty Glembotzky, recorded the first moments of the collapse of the South Tower. Upon realizing the building was collapsing, Burkett shouted to flee the scene and began running. Burkett and Glembotzky recorded the aftermath of the collapse as dust and debris covered the area and documented as injured persons were treated by first responders. Burkett's camera operator also filmed the collapse of the North Tower 29 minutes later, after which they found shelter in an underground parking garage to avoid the toxic dust.

For this reportage on 9/11, Burkett shared or was awarded outright many prestigious honors, including the George Foster Peabody Award, the Alfred I. duPont-Columbia University Award, the Edward R. Murrow Award, and the Emmy Award for Outstanding On-Camera Achievement from the New York Chapter of the National Academy of Television Arts and Sciences.

In June 2016, Burkett was elected First Vice Chairman of the National Academy of Television Arts and Sciences by the Academy's Board of Trustees and served in that capacity until June 2018. He served on the Academy's Executive Committee from 2014 to 2018 and for two terms as President of the Academy's flagship chapter in New York from 2011 to 2015.

In May 2019, he was elected New York Chapter President for a third time by the chapter's Board of Governors.

In September 2019, Burkett was elected to the Board of Trustees of Newark Public Radio, the operator of jazz-formatted WBGO in Newark, New Jersey.
