= Jerome Murphy =

American football player (born 1987)

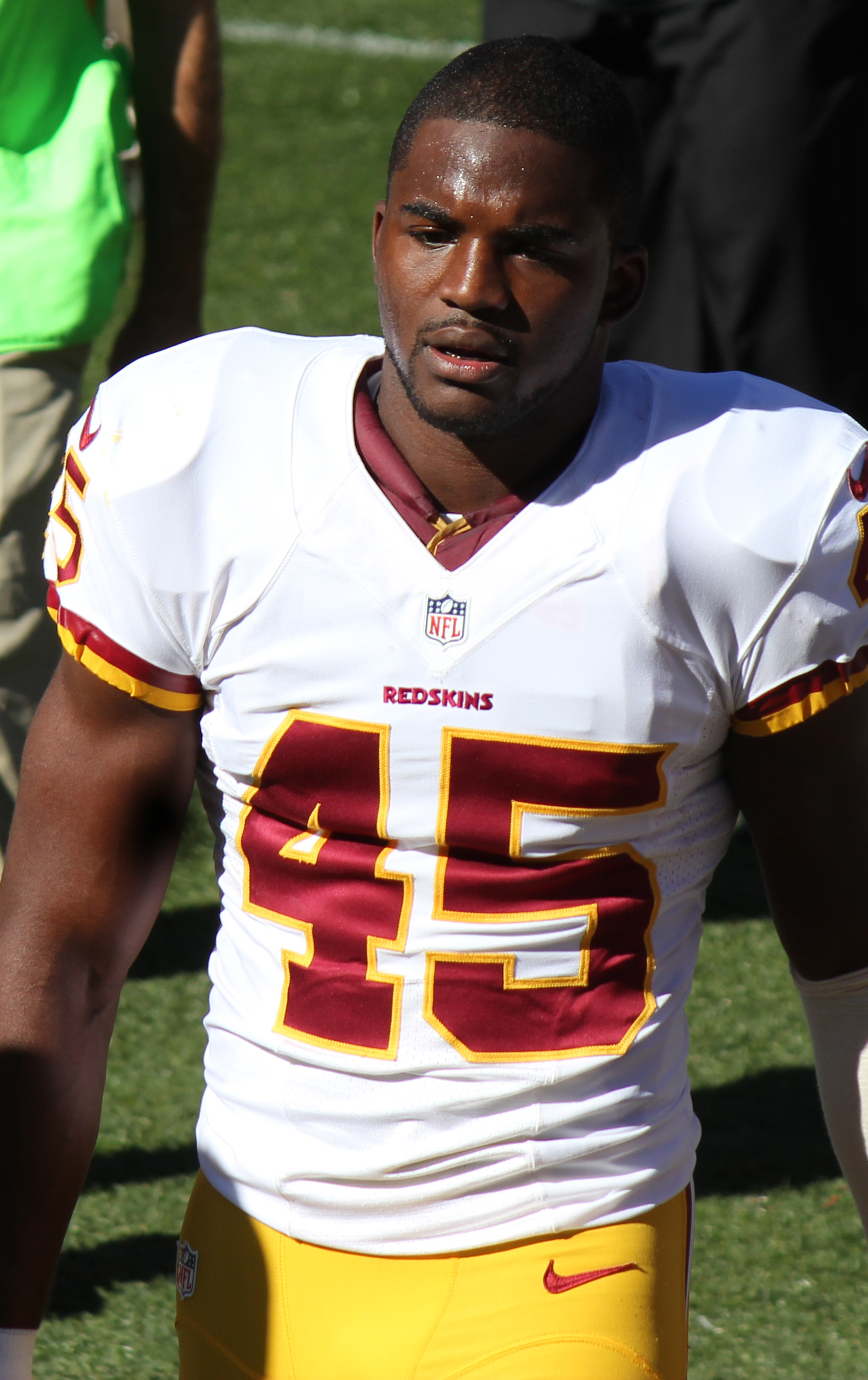
- Murphy with the Washington Redskins in 2013

No. 23, 31, 27, 45
- Position: Cornerback

Personal information
- Born: January 13, 1987 (age 39); Elizabeth, New Jersey, U.S.
- Listed height: 6 ft 0 in (1.83 m)
- Listed weight: 200 lb (91 kg)

Career information
- High school: Elizabeth
- College: South Florida
- NFL draft: 2010: 3rd round, 65th overall pick

Career history
- St. Louis Rams (2010–2011); New Orleans Saints (2012); Detroit Lions (2012); Washington Redskins (2012–2013); Denver Broncos (2014)*
- * Offseason or practice squad member only

Awards and highlights
- First-team All-Big East (2009)

Career NFL statistics
- Total tackles: 41
- Forced fumbles: 2
- Fumble recoveries: 1
- Pass deflections: 3
- Interceptions: 1
- Stats at Pro Football Reference

Jerome Murphy (born January 13, 1987) is an American former professional football player who was a cornerback in the National Football League (NFL). He was selected by the St. Louis Rams in the third round of the 2010 NFL draft. He played college football for the South Florida Bulls.

He was also a member of the New Orleans Saints, Detroit Lions, Washington Redskins, and Denver Broncos.

== Early life ==
Murphy attended Elizabeth High School. He played defensive back and wide receiver. As a senior, he had 89 tackles and eight interceptions on defense and 582 receiving yards with seven touchdowns on offense.

== College career ==
Murphy attended the University of South Florida from 2005 to 2009. As a senior, he was a first-team all-Big East selection by Phil Steele. During his career he started 25 of 51 games, recording 178 tackles, eight interceptions, and two forced fumbles.

== Professional career ==
Pre-draft measurables
Height	Weight	Arm length	Hand span	40-yard dash	10-yard split	20-yard split	20-yard shuttle	Three-cone drill	Vertical jump	Broad jump	Bench press
6 ft 0 1/4 in (1.84 m)	196 lb (89 kg)	32 1/4 in (0.82 m)	9 in (0.23 m)	4.51 s	1.63 s	2.62 s	4.05 s	6.87 s	38 in (0.97 m)	10 ft 7 in (3.23 m)	16 reps
All values from NFL Combine/Pro Day

=== St. Louis Rams ===
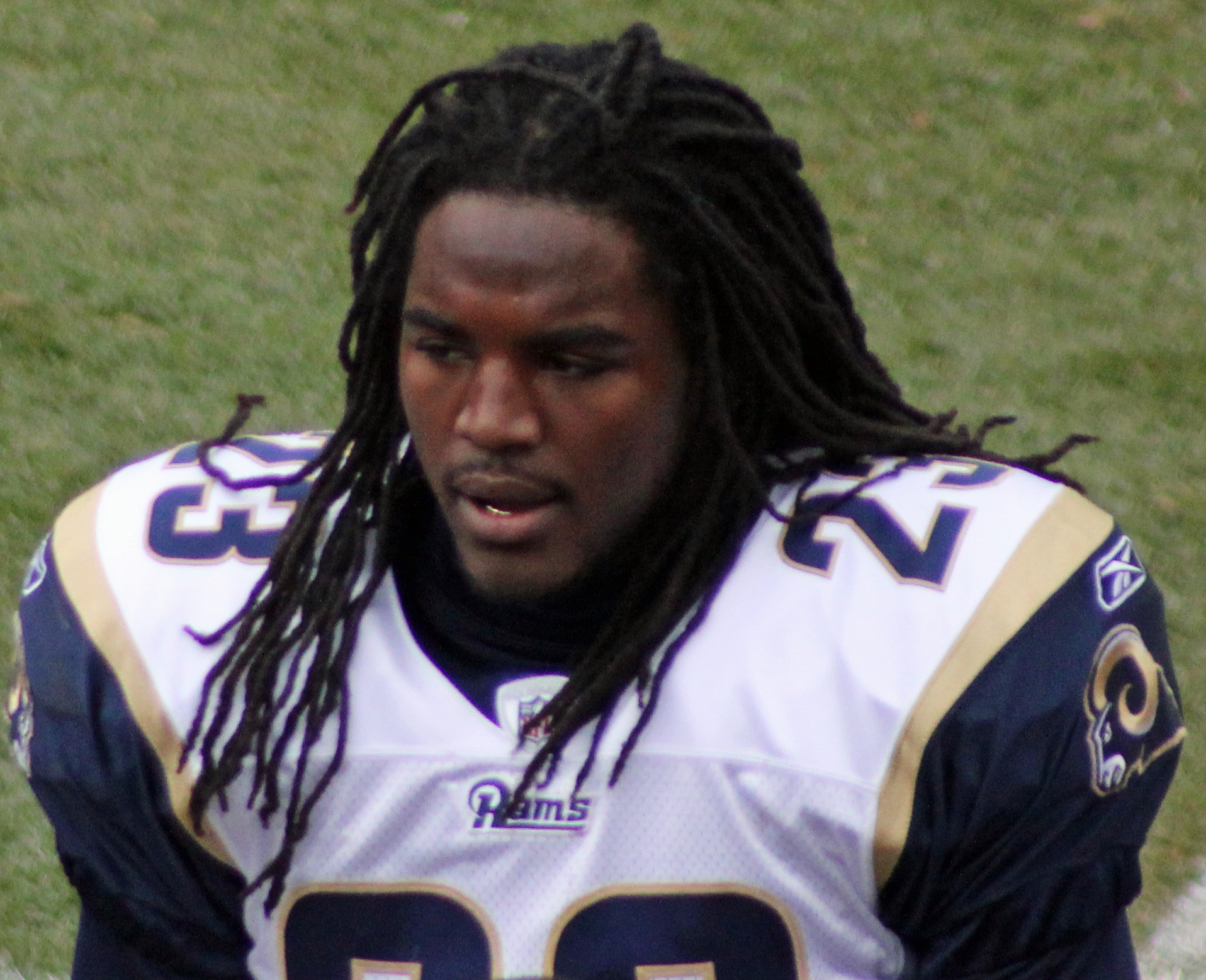
Murphy with the St. Louis Rams in 2010

Murphy was selected in the third round of the 2010 NFL draft by the St. Louis Rams with the 65th overall pick. He was placed on injured reserve on August 31, 2011.

=== New Orleans Saints ===
Murphy was waived by the Rams on September 1, 2012 and claimed by New Orleans Saints the next day. He was waived on September 17.

=== Detroit Lions ===
On September 18, he was claimed off waivers by the Detroit Lions.

=== Washington Redskins ===
On November 19, 2012, he was signed by the Washington Redskins. Murphy was waived on November 26, 2013.

=== Denver Broncos ===
Murphy, along with seven other players, were signed to future contracts with the Denver Broncos on January 22, 2014. He was released on August 30 for final roster cuts before the start of the 2014 season.
