= Ed Beach =

American basketball player (1929–1996)

Personal information
- Born: January 25, 1929 Elizabeth, New Jersey
- Died: March 15, 1996 (aged 67) Morgantown, West Virginia
- Listed height: 6 ft 3 in (1.91 m)
- Listed weight: 200 lb (91 kg)

Career information
- High school: Thomas Jefferson (Elizabeth, New Jersey)
- College: West Virginia (1946–1950)
- NBA draft: 1950: 5th round, 59th overall pick
- Drafted by: Minneapolis Lakers
- Playing career: 1950–1951
- Position: Forward
- Number: 12

Career history
- 1950: Minneapolis Lakers
- 1950–1951: Tri-Cities Blackhawks

Career highlights
- Third-team All-American – Helms (1948)
- Stats at NBA.com
- Stats at Basketball Reference

Edward Leon Beach Jr. (January 25, 1929 – March 15, 1996) was an American basketball player.

Beach played collegiately for the West Virginia University. He was selected by the Minneapolis Lakers in the 5th round of the 1950 NBA draft. He played for the Lakers and Tri-Cities Blackhawks (1950–51) in the NBA for 12 games. His career in the NBA ended when he was drafted in the United States Army for the Korean War.

== Career statistics ==
Legend
GP	Games played	GS	Games started	MPG	Minutes per game
FG%	Field goal percentage	3P%	3-point field goal percentage	FT%	Free throw percentage
RPG	Rebounds per game	APG	Assists per game	SPG	Steals per game
BPG	Blocks per game	PPG	Points per game	**Bold**	Career high

=== NBA ===
==== Regular season ====
Year	Team	GP	FG%	FT%	RPG	APG	PPG
1950–51	Minneapolis	**11**	**.229**	**.667**	**2.3**	.2	**2.0**
1950–51	Tri-Cities	1	.000	–	.0	**1.0**	.0
Career		12	.211	.667	2.1	.3	1.8
