= Digital Harbor High School =

Coordinates: 39°16′37″N 76°36′26″W

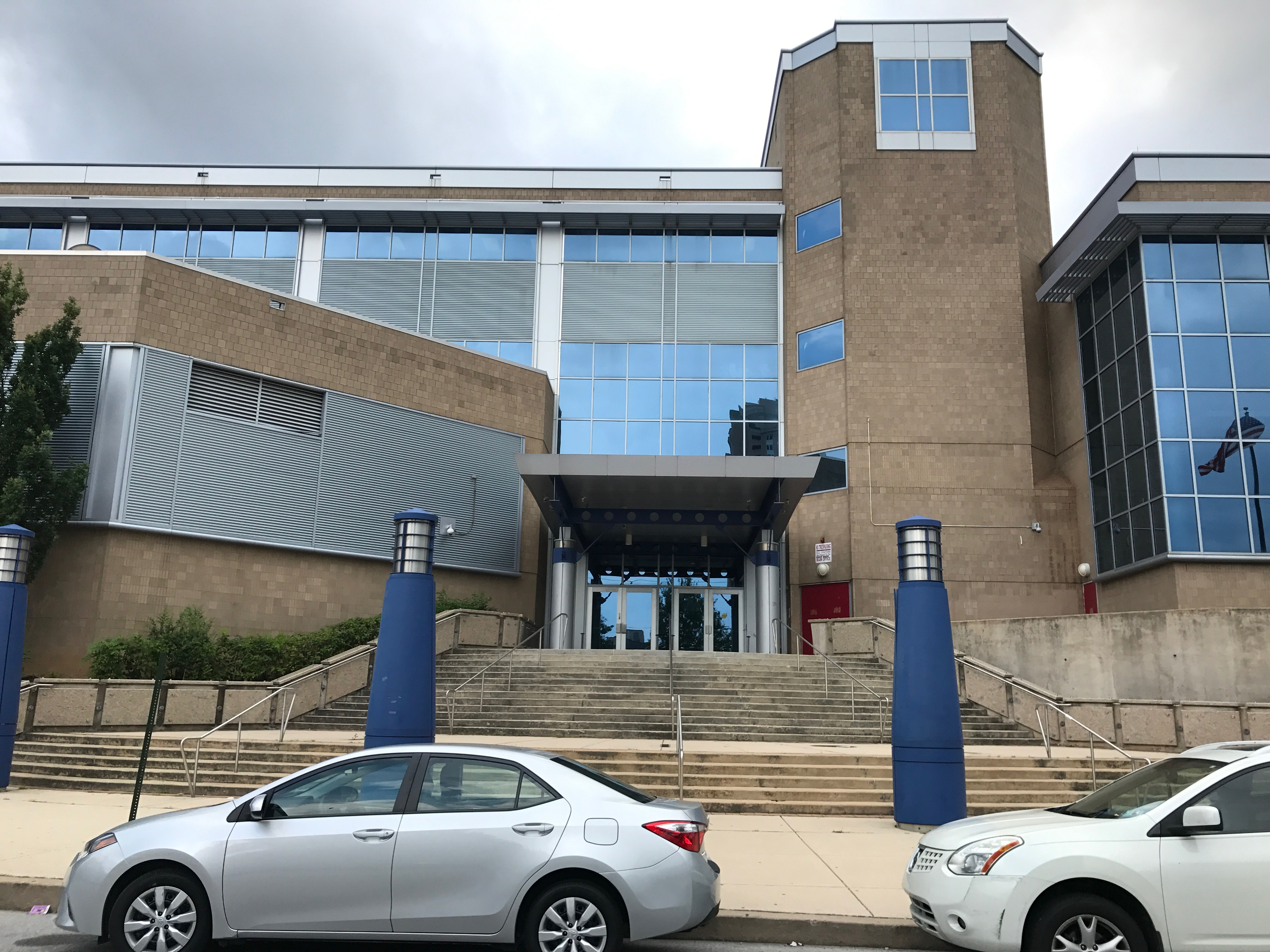

Location
- 1100 Covington Street; Baltimore, Maryland 21230; United States

Information
- School type: Public, Magnet, Comprehensive
- Motto: "Learning, Serving, and Leading through Technology"
- Founded: 2002
- School district: Baltimore City Public Schools
- School number: 416
- Principal: Taiisha Swinton-Buck
- Grades: 9–12
- Enrollment: 1196
- Area: Urban
- Colors: Columbia Blue, Black, and White
- Mascot: RAM's (Random Access Memory), but the sports logo has an actual ram
- Website: www.digitalharborrams.org

Digital Harbor High School is a magnet high school located in Baltimore, Maryland, United States. Occupying the campus of the former Southern High School, it is currently one of two secondary schools and a comprehensive high school that specializes in information technology of Baltimore.

== History ==
The vision for Digital Harbor High School started in 2000 when then-Baltimore schools chief Carmen V. Russo wanted to create a high school for computer studies in downtown Baltimore. Southern High School was the chosen site for the new school because it had suffered low graduation rates and disorder in recent years. Its prime location near Inner Harbor in the gentrifying Federal Hill neighborhood made it an attractive choice for a magnet school drawing students from citywide. A planning committee convened and a multimillion-dollar renovation project was undertaken over a five-year period. The building was completely transformed, with approximately $50 million spent to renovate the campus, with $6 million allocated toward information technology and audio visual equipment.

The school was partially designed by the original principal, Michael Pitroff (2002–2005), who is said to be the "Father of Digital Harbor." In 2005, he was reassigned to be the Technology Department Head for the Baltimore school system. The pupil transition from the old Southern High School began in 2002 with the entering 9th graders inaugurating the new school. With the graduation of Southern High School's last Class of 2005, all grade levels for Digital Harbor High School were phased in and another school, the National Academy Foundation School, was also housed on its first floor.

== Academics ==
The academic focus of the school has been on computers and information technology. Digital Harbor's school compass logo represents the curriculum is divided into four separated into 6 separate areas of study ("pathways") for students to choose from:

- Interactive Media Production (IMP)
- IT Networking Academy (Cisco)
- Database Academy (Oracle)
- Information Support and Services (ISS)
- Geographic Information Systems (GIS) & Remote Sensing (RI)
- Computer Science

The students must meet not only the BCPSS requirements for graduation, but must also fulfill the requirements for their particular "pathway" as well. Currently, Digital Harbor is one of the most technologically advanced schools in the city. During the 2013–2014 school year, the school's population increased to 1409 students.

== Facilities and policies ==
Digital Harbor is a first among Baltimore City Schools, with millions of dollars in equipment devoted to modernizing all of the classrooms and the adding of Wi-Fi and wired internet access all over the school.

The majority of the desktop computers come from Dell with Windows XP Professional, and IBM Thinkpad laptops, although the media pathway has Macintosh computers as well for use of particular students.

All four floors have pathway offices designed with the school colors.

=== School uniform ===
The school currently has a school uniform dress code which includes khaki pants, a polo shirt or oxford shirt in Columbia blue or white as well as a polo shirt or oxford shirt in black exclusively for registered seniors; and the school sweatshirt or sweater with the compass logo or in black. For the 2011–2012 school year the school introduced a royal blue polo shirt for the incoming ninth graders

== Sports ==
The Rams compete in Maryland Public Secondary Schools Athletic Association Class 3A. As of the 2013–2014 school year, varsity and junior varsity level sports include:

- Badminton
- Baseball
- Boys' Basketball
- Boys' Lacrosse
- Boys' Track and Field
- Dance Team
- Football
- Girls' Basketball
- Girls' Lacrosse
- Girls' Track and Field
- Softball
- Swimming
- Tennis
- Volleyball
- Wrestling
- In 2005, the Rams track team won the Class 2A-1A Central region title, Class 1A South Regional crown and the state title.
- The varsity softball team was undefeated in the same year and placed first in the city.
- The football team has also been on the rise since its inception, which is reflective in their season records:
  - 2004: 2 W - 7 L
  - 2005: 3 W - 7 L
  - 2006: 5 W - 5 L
  - 2007: 8 W - 3 L (City Champions)
  - 2007: 10W - 0 L (JV City Champions) Win over City College
- From 2007 to 2013, the Rams baseball team went undefeated in the city and won the Baltimore City Championship. This stopped in the 2014 season when the team lost to Academy for College and Career Exploration
- Winter of 2008, the boys' indoor track team finished first in the state.
- In March 2009 both the Rams boys' and girls' basketball teams won the state 1A championship in basketball.

== Clubs ==
Digital Harbor offers a variety of clubs for students. Clubs currently offered at Digital Harbor include:

- City Life, a Youth for Christ club
- Equestrian Club
- Band
- Chess Club
- Inner-city Outings Club
- International Club
- Anime Graphics
- Architecture, Engineering, and Construction/ACE
- Literary Magazine
- Art Club
- MESA
- Cheerleaders
- Music Entrepreneurs
- National Honor Society
- Choir
- Peer Mediators
- Crew (Rowing)
- Quiz Bowl
- Computer Gaming
- Student Government
- Dance Club
- Robotics Club
- Drama Club
- Sailing Club
- Debate Team
- Songwriters
- Environmental Club
- Yearbook/ The Compass
- Newspaper/Digital Desktop
- Fashion Club

== Notable alumni ==
- Al Kaline, member of Baseball Hall of Fame
- Brian "Axl Rotten" Knighton, professional wrestler
- Gervonta Davis, professional boxer, WBA Lightweight and WBA Light welterweight champion
- Ian Thomas, American football

== Achievements ==
The school was honored by M&T Bank with a $5,000 loan to start a school store, which sells several school oriented memorabilia (cups, mugs, School Uniforms, wristbands etc.); and also sells snacks, drinks, and school supplies. The store was given the loan based on a presentation given by a group of students in the National Foundation for Teaching Entrepreneurship (NFTE) program. The bank has even donated a school mascot uniform to the school named Nifty (after the NFTE program).
