= Thomas Jefferson Arts Academy =

High school in Union County, New Jersey, US

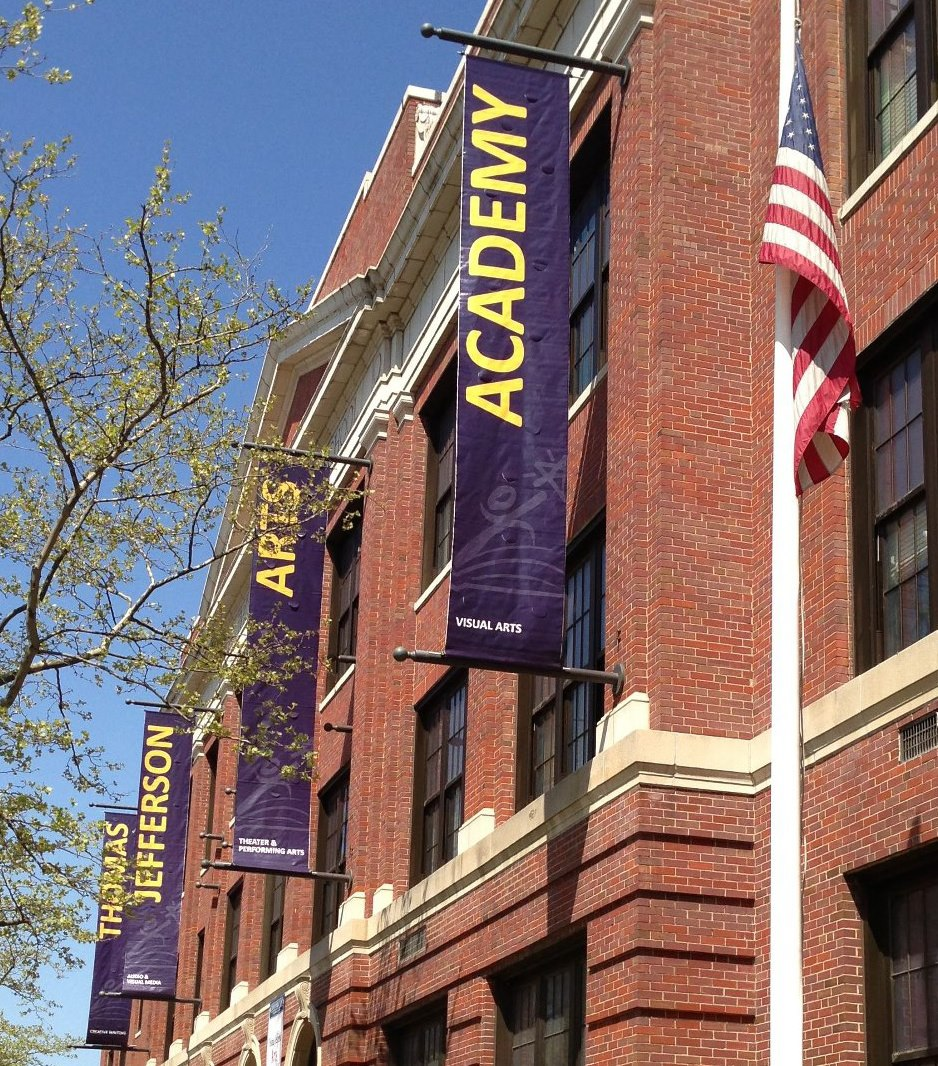

Location
- 27 Martin Luther King Jr. Plaza; Elizabeth, Union County, New Jersey 07201; United States; 40°39′48″N 74°12′39″W

Information
- Type: Public high school
- Established: 1928
- School district: Elizabeth Public Schools
- NCES School ID: 340459003049
- Principal: Mona Wanis
- Faculty: 86.0 FTEs
- Grades: 9-12
- Enrollment: 1,156 (as of 2023–24)
- Student to teacher ratio: 13.4:1
- Campus: Urban
- Colors: Purple and gold
- Athletics conference: UCIAC
- Mascot: The Liberty
- Accreditation: Middle States Association of Colleges and Schools
- Website: jefferson.epsnj.org

Thomas Jefferson Arts Academy is a public high school in Elizabeth, New Jersey in Union County in the United States, specializing in the visual, performing, and media arts. Located in historic Midtown, the school serves students in ninth through twelfth grades as part of the Elizabeth Public Schools.

Located across the street from Elizabeth's City Hall and the monuments of Winfield Scott Park, and Martin Luther King Jr monument, Thomas Jefferson Arts Academy is the oldest building of all the Elizabeth Public Schools high school academies. Jefferson Arts was first built in 1928 as an all-boys high school and named for the primary author of the Declaration of Independence and third president of the United States. In 1977, the former Thomas Jefferson High School (for boys) merged with the newly constructed Elizabeth High School main complex; the school was renamed Thomas Jefferson House of Elizabeth High School. The school is now a high school academy and the center for the district's visual and performing arts programs. The school has been accredited by the Middle States Association of Colleges and Schools Commission on Elementary and Secondary Schools since 2013.

As of the 2023–24 school year, the school had an enrollment of 1,156 students and 86.0 classroom teachers (on an FTE basis), for a student–teacher ratio of 13.4:1. There were 766 students (66.3% of enrollment) eligible for free lunch and 146 (12.6% of students) eligible for reduced-cost lunch.

== Awards, recognition and rankings ==
The school was named a Model School in the Arts by the New Jersey Arts Education Partnership in 2013. During the spring of 2014, the school was awarded the Healthy Schools Silver Award by the Alliance for a Healthier Generation Healthy Schools Program.

Additionally, Thomas Jefferson Arts Academy students have been nominated and received awards in numerous, local and regional competitions including:

- Music in the Parks
- Montclair State University's Theatre Night Awards
- Paper Mill Playhouse's Rising Star Awards
- College of New Jersey's K-12 Student Art Exhibition
- SkillsUSA

The school was the 321st-ranked public high school in New Jersey out of 339 schools statewide in New Jersey Monthly magazine's September 2014 cover story on the state's "Top Public High Schools", using a new ranking methodology. The school had been ranked 328th in the state of 328 schools in 2012.

The 2016 High School Challenge Index published by The Washington Post, a continuation of high-school rankings formerly published in Newsweek, identified Thomas Jefferson Arts Academy as the 46th-ranked public high school in New Jersey out of 339 statewide; the school was ranked No. 1157 nationally.

== Curriculum ==
Students enrolled in the Thomas Jefferson Arts Academy complete both a college preparatory academic curriculum, as well as a studio program in the visual, performing or media arts. The school's curriculum is geared toward preparing students for postsecondary education and developing their creative talents. The school's academic program includes:

- Four years of coursework in English, mathematics, science, social studies, and physical education/health
- Two to four years of study in foreign languages including Spanish, French, Italian, or Portuguese
- Additional coursework in career readiness
- Preparation for state-required high school exit exams
- Honors and Advanced Placement classes offered to all interested students

Thomas Jefferson Arts Academy's Advancement Via Individual Determination (AVID) is a college-readiness system designed to increase the number of students who enroll in four-year colleges. Specially designed for students who may need academic support or who may be the first in their families to attend college, students in the AVID program participate in a daily elective course that offers academic support and college preparation. AVID students also engage in regular tutorials, college preparation sessions and trips, career readiness experiences, and other activities to support their academic and personal growth. Participation in the AVID program is by application only.

Thomas Jefferson Arts Academy offers five studio programs in the arts. These include:

- Audio and Visual Media. The A/V Media program offers preparation in audio and video editing, programming, and production techniques. Students have the opportunity to study in both a graphic print shop, as well as in the Jefferson Arts Television Studio.
- Creative Writing. The Creative Writing program offers young authors a rich curriculum to support their creative talents. Students study various writing genres and have opportunities to publish through in- school and out-of-school publications.
- Performing Arts. The Performing Arts program offers preparation in instrumental music, vocal music, and dance. Performers may participate in several concert band, orchestra, string, and jazz ensembles, while receiving instruction in music theory, composition, and improvisation. Live performances are an important focus of this program.
- Theater. The Theater program offers preparation in live performance, technical theater, stage movement, principles of scenic design, children's theater, costume structure and design, and make-up. Live performances are an important focus of this program.
- Visual Arts. The Visual Arts program prepares young artists for advanced study in drawing, painting, computer graphics, commercial art, and sculpture. Students have multiple opportunities over the course of each school year to exhibit their work in school and throughout the community.

== Graduation requirements ==
Graduation requirements for students at Thomas Jefferson Arts Academy include:

- Successful completion of 140 credit hours of coursework
- Successful completion of 60 hours of community service (with 25 hours to be completed in a student's senior year)
- Successful completion of New Jersey statewide assessment graduation requirements

The Thomas Jefferson Arts Academy website offers more details about graduation requirements and course sequence.

== Admissions ==
Each studio program at Thomas Jefferson Arts Academy requires an audition and entry interview. Requirements include the following:

Audio and Visual Media. Students create a short video explaining why they wish to study media and television production. This video may be submitted by mini-DV tape, DVD, or uploaded electronically by directions explained at the audition. All videos must be labeled clearly with full name, ID number, and present school. Genuine interest and creativity should be highlights of this video. Cameras are available at audition sessions for those who wish to create a video on-site.

Creative Writing. Students prepare a portfolio that includes three poems, one work of fiction and a reflection page. The poems should be of substantial length (at least 15 lines). The work of fiction may be a first draft, but must be of considerable ambition or length (at least 400-500 words). The reflection is an overall response on students' goals, current works in progress, and previous literary and writing experiences.

Performing arts. After an interview, students select an audition focus:

- Dance: Students take a mini-ballet/ modern combination class and perform a five minute solo dance. Students are asked to wear attire which includes (but is not limited to) leotard and tights, black tank and jazz style pants, or black shorts (no baggy clothes). Students are also asked to bring musical accompaniment.
- Instrumental Music: Students prepare a piece to be played from memory or sheet music, play any major and minor scale (up to 4 flats and 4 sharps) on the instrument, and play a variety of chords. Students also sight read a simple melodic piece which will be provided at the time of audition.
- Vocal Music: Students prepare a song (no more than one minute) a cappella (without instrumental accompaniment) and sing several scales while a teacher plays the scales on the piano.

Theater. Students perform a one- to three-minute memorized monologue (i.e. a speech made by one person portraying a character and directed at the audience; the performer may pretend that the audience is the other character). Monologues may be dramatic or comedic. The audition focuses on how well the performer portrays a character while delivering the monologue. Students are asked to refrain from dressing in costume or bringing props for auditions.

Visual arts. Students submit a portfolio of original artwork including at least five pieces that show evidence of visual experience and demonstration of artistic strengths and talents, including the capacity for learning different media. Portfolio pieces and sketch books should display a student's abilities with use of color, composition, two-dimensional and three-dimensional concepts, creativity, tone, and presentation. They may be original or representational drawings from life demonstrating ability for entry into Drawing & Painting, Photography, Sculpture, Creative Crafts, and Graphic Design concentrations.

== Athletics ==
Thomas Jefferson Arts Academy students participate in sports that represent all Elizabeth high school academies under the banner of the Elizabeth Minutemen. Elizabeth athletic teams compete in the Union County Interscholastic Athletic Conference, a high school sports association that operates under the jurisdiction of the New Jersey State Interscholastic Athletic Association (NJSIAA). With 5,049 students in grades 10-12, the school was classified by the NJSIAA for the 2019–20 school year as Group IV for most athletic competition purposes, which included schools with an enrollment of 1,060 to 5,049 students in that grade range.

== Administration ==
The school's principal is Mona Wanis. Her core administration team includes two vice principals.
