= John E. Dwyer Technology Academy =

High school in Union County, New Jersey, US

Location
- 123 South Pearl Street; Elizabeth, Union County, New Jersey 07202; United States; 40.6603384°N 74.2117435°W

Information
- Other names: John E. Dwyer House (Dwyer House)
- Type: public high school
- Established: 2009; 17 years ago
- School district: Elizabeth Public Schools
- NCES School ID: 340459003071
- Principal: Sulisnet Jimenez
- Faculty: 93.5 FTEs
- Grades: 9-12
- Enrollment: approx. 1 350 (2024-25)
- Campus: Urban
- Colors: Green and Black
- Team name: The Mintuemen
- Accreditation: Middle States Association of Colleges and Schools
- Website: dwyer.epsnj.org

The John E. Dwyer Technology Academy is a four-year comprehensive public high school, located on South Pearl Street in Elizabeth in Union County, New Jersey, United States. Founded in 2009, it serves grades nine through twelve. As of 2025, the school had approximately 1 300 students enrolled.

== History ==
The John E. Dwyer Technology Academy was established in 2009.

The school was named in honor of John E. Dwyer, an Elizabeth educator for many years who served as a teacher and guidance counselor, as well as vice principal, principal and as Superintendent of Schools.

In September 2010, Elizabeth Public Schools partnered with The National Academy Foundation for a Year of Planning - Academy Development Process to establish the Academy of Information Technology as a career academy at the school.

The school was accredited by the Middle States Association of Colleges and Schools Commission on Elementary and Secondary Schools in 2013.

In January 2026, an incident took place at the school when car crashed into the exterior wall of the auditorium.

== Governance ==
The school is part of Elizabeth Public Schools. The core administration team includes one main principal and three vice principals.

== Curriculum ==
The school offers students the opportunity to explore careers in areas such as computer science, architectural design, and urban planning.

Students participate in one of the two strands of study offered - Industrial Technology and Information Technology.

== Sport and extracurricular activities ==
Along with various extracurricular activities, the school has several national honor societies including: National Honor Society, National English Honor Society, Mu Alpha Theta Math Honor Society, National Art Honor Society, and Rho Kappa Social Studies Honor Society.

== Campus ==
The Technology Academy shares one large building with the Admiral William Halsey Leadership Academy, the Peter B. Gold Administration Building, and the Thomas Dunn Sports Center, which together form the Main Complex most commonly known as "The Main" to students and teachers. The Main complex holds more students, teachers, and administrators than the other high school in the city. It is known as the heart of all Elizabeth Academies.

The ninth-grade students of John E. Dwyer are housed in the Annex Building, which was originally located at 501 Union Avenue. Beginning in September 2022 the Annex Building will be moved to St. Anthony’s, located at 853 Third Avenue.

== Awards and recognition ==
The school was the 329th-ranked public high school in New Jersey out of 339 schools statewide in New Jersey Monthly magazine's September 2014 cover story on the state's "Top Public High Schools", using a new ranking methodology. The school had been ranked 306th in the state of 328 schools in 2012.

== See also ==
- List of high schools in New Jersey
