= Elizabeth Public Schools =

School district in Union County, New Jersey, US

Address
- 500 North Broad Street Elizabeth, Union County, New Jersey, 07208; United States
- Coordinates: 40.663509°N 74.21151°W

District information
- Motto: "Every Child, Achieving Excellence"
- Grades: PreK-12
- President: Iliana Chevres
- Vice-president: Charlene Bathelus Dorgely
- Superintendent: Olga Hugelmeyer
- Business administrator: Harold Kennedy
- Schools: 36
- Affiliation: Former Abbott district

Students and staff
- Enrollment: 28,712 (as of 2018–19)
- Faculty: 2,173.0 FTEs
- Student–teacher ratio: 13.2:1
- Colors: Gold; Navy Blue

Other information
- District Factor Group: A
- Website: www.epsnj.org
Ind.	Per pupil	District spending	Rank (*)	K-12 average	%± vs. average
1A	Total Spending	$21,722	88	$18,891	15.0%
1	Budgetary Cost	17,444	95	14,783	18.0%
2	Classroom Instruction	10,704	97	8,763	22.1%
6	Support Services	2,620	77	2,392	9.5%
8	Administrative Cost	1,470	56	1,485	−1.0%
10	Operations & Maintenance	2,396	92	1,783	34.4%
13	Extracurricular Activities	176	22	268	−34.3%
16	Median Teacher Salary	76,558	94	64,043
Data from NJDoE 2014 Taxpayers' Guide to Education Spending. *Of K-12 districts with more than 3,500 students. Lowest spending=1; Highest=103

Elizabeth Public Schools is a public school district in Elizabeth, in Union County, in the U.S. state of New Jersey, serving students in pre-kindergarten through twelfth grade. The district is one of 31 former Abbott districts statewide that were established pursuant to the decision by the New Jersey Supreme Court in Abbott v. Burke which are now referred to as "SDA Districts" based on the requirement for the state to cover all costs for school building and renovation projects in these districts under the supervision of the New Jersey Schools Development Authority. The district was the third largest in New Jersey in 2022, with a culturally diverse student body coming from 50 countries and speaking more than 37 languages.

As of the 2018–19 school year, the district, comprising 36 schools, had an enrollment of 28,712 students and 2,173.0 classroom teachers (on an FTE basis), for a student–teacher ratio of 13.2:1.

The district is classified by the New Jersey Department of Education as being in District Factor Group "A", the lowest of eight groupings. District Factor Groups organize districts statewide to allow comparison by common socioeconomic characteristics of the local districts. From lowest socioeconomic status to highest, the categories are A, B, CD, DE, FG, GH, I and J.

== Awards, recognition and rankings ==
In 2015, Elizabeth High School was one of 15 schools in New Jersey, and one of nine public schools, recognized as a National Blue Ribbon School in the exemplary high performing category by the United States Department of Education.

In the 2008-09 school year, Victor Mravlag Elementary School No. 21 was recognized with the Blue Ribbon School Award of Excellence by the United States Department of Education, the highest award an American school can receive. For the 2006-07 school year, William F. Halloran Alternative School #22 was one of four schools in New Jersey recognized with the Blue Ribbon Award. William F. Halloran Alternative School #22 earned a second award when it was one of 11 in the state to be recognized in 2014 by the National Blue Ribbon Schools Program. Terence C. Reilly was also recognized as a National Blue Ribbon school in 2013 and was recognized as a NJ School of Character and National School of Character. Terence C. Reilly is also an Apple Distinguished School and Top 25 in New Jersey. Terence C. Reilly School No. 7 was honored by the National Blue Ribbon Schools Program in 2019, one of nine schools in the state recognized as Exemplary High Performing Schools.

In 2007, Dr. Albert Einstein Academy School No. 29 became one of 24 schools selected from across the United States and the only NASA Explore School in the state of New Jersey at that time.

In the 2012 "High School Challenge" published by The Washington Post, a continuation of high-school rankings formerly published in Newsweek, ranked Elizabeth High School as the best public high school in New Jersey, and the 76th-best in the United States.

== History ==
Battin High School was constructed in 1913 at 300 South Broad Street on the site of a mansion that had been donated to the city nearly 25 years earlier by Joseph Battin, president of the Elizabethtown Water Company, and namesake of the school. Originally operated on a coeducational basis, the school became female only starting in 1929, after Thomas Jefferson High School was constructed and dedicated to serve male students. In 1977, district officials stated that the inability to determine attendance zones for the two comprehensive high schools after Thomas Jefferson High School opened in 1929 combined with the expansive shop facilities in the new building, led the district to decide to split students by sex, with girls at Battin and boys at Thomas Jefferson. By 1972, Battin was the only public high school in New Jersey operated exclusively for women, despite coeducational programs at both Princeton University and Vassar College. By that time, a policy under which pregnant students had been required to withdraw from school had been eliminated and students were allowed to return to school after giving birth and attending a special off-site program during their pregnancy. Though 40% of graduating students went on to college and district officials insisted that the curriculum was standard across the district's separate high schools, a student criticized the difference in expectations of male and female students, noting that "Boys are expected to be engineers and attorneys. Girls are supposed to be secretaries and mothers."

Battin High School and Thomas Jefferson High School were both closed at the end of the 1976-77 school year, after the Elizabeth High School complex was completed and all of the district's students, male and female, were accommodated at the new four-building facility, ending the city's status as "the only community in the state with separate public high schools for boys and girls". The $29.3 million project included renovations to Thomas Jefferson High School, which was integrated into the new complex. The Battin High School building, together with the four existing junior high schools, was repurposed as a middle school for grades six through eight.

== Schools ==
Schools in the district (with 2018–19 enrollment data from the National Center for Education Statistics) are:

Early childhood centers

- Frances C. Smith Center for Early Childhood Education No. 50 (304 students; in grade PreK)
- Donald Stewart Center for Early Childhood Education No. 51 (300; PreK)
- Dr. Martin Luther King Jr. Center for Early Childhood Education No. 52 (307; PreK)

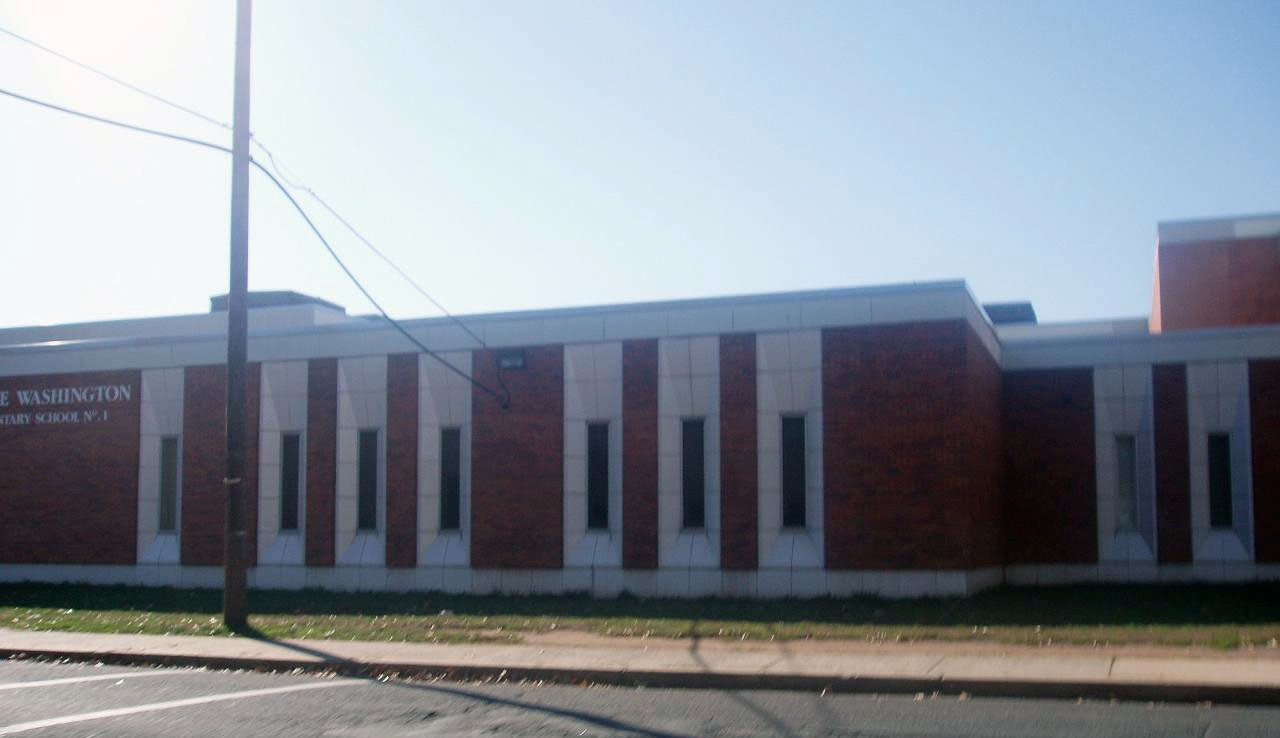
George Washington Academy School # 1

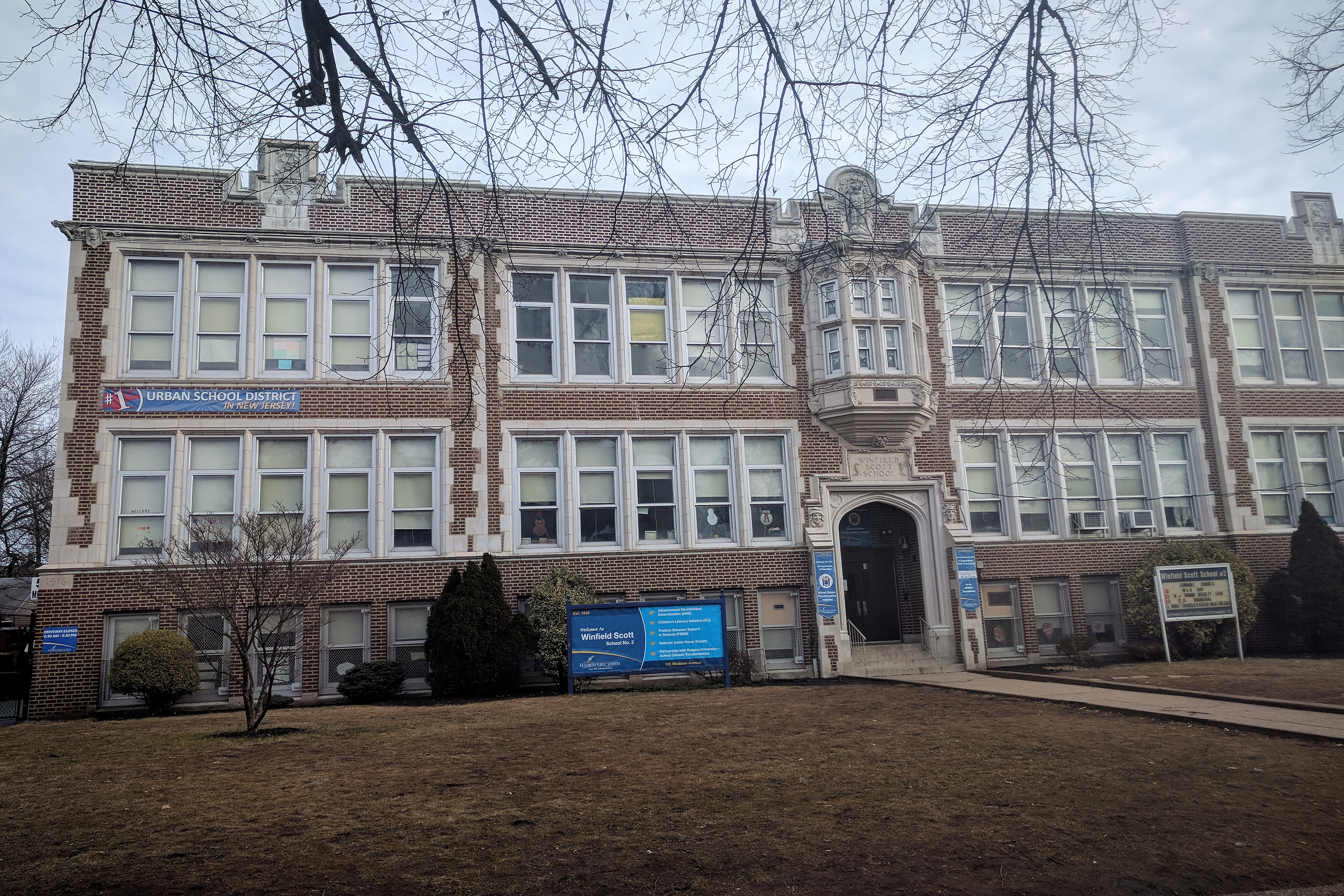
Winfield Scott School # 2

Elementary and Middle schools

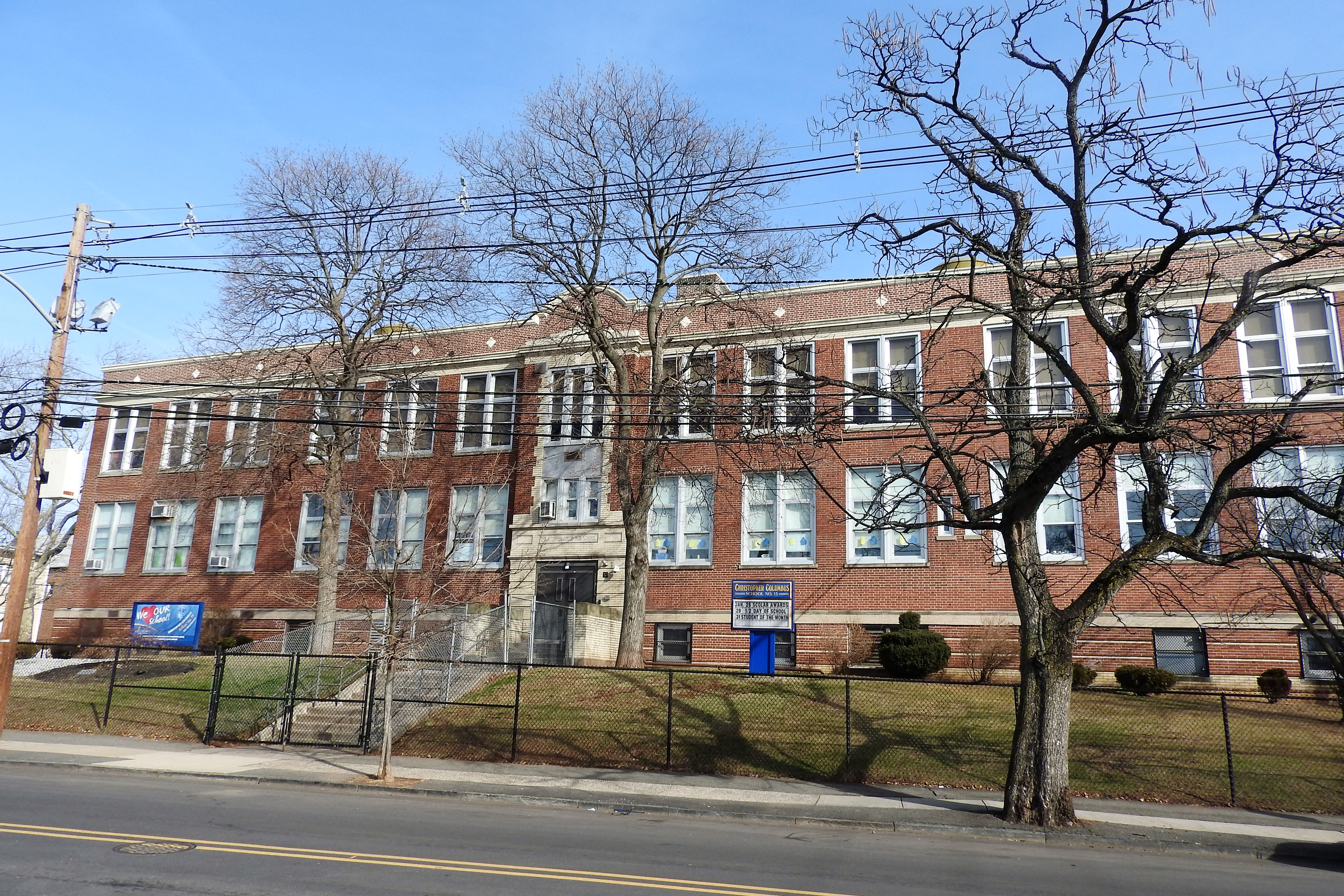
Christopher Columbus School # 15

- George Washington Academy School No. 1 (579; PreK-8)
- Winfield Scott School No. 2 (655; PreK-8)
- Nicholas S. La Corte-Peterstown School No. 3 (728; K-8)
- Joseph Battin School No. 4 (825; K-8)
- Mabel G. Holmes School No. 5 (863; PreK-8)
- Toussaint L'ouverture-Marquis de Lafayette School No. 6 (formally known as Toussaint L'ouverture School) (1,085; PreK-8)
- Terence C. Reilly School No. 7 (1,087; Pre-K and 2-8)
- iPrep Academy School No. 8 (431; K-8)
- Jerome Dunn Academy No. 9 (863; K-8)
- Elmora School No. 12 (688; PreK-8)
- Benjamin Franklin School No. 13 (463; K-8)
- Abraham Lincoln School No. 14 (875; K-8)
- Christopher Columbus School No. 15 (665; K-8)
- Madison-Monroe School No. 16 (658; PreK-8)
- Robert Morris School No. 18 (573; K-8)
- Woodrow Wilson School No. 19 (656; PreK-8)
- John Marshall School No. 20 (382; K-8)
- Victor Mravlag School No. 21 (581; PreK-8)
- William F. Halloran No. 22 (1,108; PreK and 2-8)
- Nicholas Murray Butler School No. 23 (848; PreK-8)
- Sonia Sotomayor School No. 25 (formerly known as Charles J. Hudson School) (609; K-8)
- Dr. Orlando Edreira Academy School No. 26 (680; PreK-8)
- Dr. Antonia Pantoja School No. 27 (971; PreK-8)
- Juan Pablo Duarte - José Julián Martí School No. 28 (952; PreK-8)
- Dr. Albert Einstein Academy School No. 29 (890; PreK-8)
- Chessie Dentley Roberts Academy No. 30 (808; PreK-8)

High schools

- Elizabeth High School Frank J. Cicarell Aacdemy (1,152; 9-12)
- J. Christian Bollwage Finance Academy (420; 9-12)
- John E. Dwyer Technology Academy (1,340; 9-12)
- Thomas A. Edison Career and Technical Academy (872; 9-12)
- Admiral William F. Halsey Jr. Health and Public Safety Academy (1,111; 9-12)
- Alexander Hamilton Preparatory Academy (1,014; 9-12)
- Thomas Jefferson Arts Academy (1,122; 9-12)
- JVJ STEM Academy - School No.92 (600; 9-12)

== Administration ==
Core members of the district's administration are:

- Olga Hugelmeyer, superintendent
- Harold Kennedy, business administrator and board secretary

== Board of education ==
The district, with nearly 29,000 students, is the third largest in New Jersey. With an estimated 28,500 students for the 2021-22 school year, the district projected an operating budget of $527 million, of which $452 million (85.8%) would be from state sources and $60 million (11.4%) from property taxes For 2016, the $507 million budget was mostly subsidized by state aid, which accounted for 82.6% of the district's budget, while property taxes covered 11.6% of the budget.

The district's board of education, composed of nine members, sets policy and oversees the fiscal and educational operation of the district through its administration. As a Type II school district, the board's trustees are elected directly by voters to serve three-year terms of office on a staggered basis, with three seats up for election each year held (since 2012) as part of the November general election. The board appoints a superintendent to oversee the district's day-to-day operations and a business administrator to supervise the business functions of the district.

The school board has long had a majority led Rafael Fajardo, a former school board president who has had at least six family members on the payroll. Although he is no longer on the panel, Fajardo had controlled the school system with the support of several board members.

== Controversy ==
In June 2011, the Union County Prosecutor's Office was investigating charges that members of the school board gave jobs and promotions to employees in exchange for political contributions. Republican members of the New Jersey General Assembly asked for records relating to district spending for entertainment, travel, equipment and other expenditures.

The Investigations Unit of the New Jersey Department of Education reviewed district practices in 2008, following a state auditor's report that undocumented aliens were being improperly hired by the district in custodial and clerical positions. The district's business administrator indicated that the district had been hiring non-citizens for math and science teaching positions due to the inability to find qualified citizens qualified to work in those positions. Other findings had shown that $88,000 was spent by the district for what was deemed to be political advertising and that employee information had been taken from confidential files to be used for soliciting political contributions.

Some other recent headlines include:

- At least $1.5M paid out secretly by Elizabeth schools, a fraction of workers' settlements;
- Elizabeth Board of Education used taxpayer money to keep lawsuits hush-hush;
- Investigation finds Elizabeth school board pressures workers to fill campaign coffers;
- Elizabeth school officials' kids don't pay full meal costs, records show;
- Former Elizabeth Public Schools Equipment Manager Robert Firestone admitted that he conspired to defraud the school system through fraudulent business practices for his personal gain, according to the FBI and US Attorney's office.

=== 2022 teacher union negotiations ===
At the end of the 2021-22 school year, negotiations between the Elizabeth Education Association, the labor union representing teachers in the Elizabeth Public Schools, had its contract expired while both the Elizabeth School District and the EEA worked on negotiations, leading to no agreement by June 29 when negotiations ended.

On August 24, 2022, Elizabeth mayor Chris Bollwage threatened on Twitter to not give any promotions to teachers who if they go on strike. The tweet has to criticism from residents and staff members. During a board meeting of the Elizabeth Board of Education, EEA President John Griffin spoke to the board demanding that it respond to the Bollwage's Tweet, mentioning that state law does not have the power for the mayor to make staffing decisions and that mayor accused Griffin over planning a strike.

A lawyer representing the teachers Union questioned the legality of the tweet including to the mayor, warning that he could face violations of the State School Ethics Act and that the tweet damaged the reputation of EEA President Griffin.
