= NBC Sunday Night Football =

American television series

- Current SNF logo, in use since 2022 (Note: The logo shown is a "marquee" variant nominally reserved for broadcasts and large-scale formats; a version intended for print/digital formats omits the "marquee" linework.)
- Genre: American football game telecasts
- Directed by: Drew Esocoff; Kaare Numme III
- Presented by: Commentators: Mike Tirico (play-by-play); Cris Collinsworth (color commentator); Jason Garrett (color commentator, select games); Noah Eagle (play-by-play, select games); Todd Blackledge (color commentator, select games); Reporters: Melissa Stark; Kaylee Hartung (select games); Rules analyst: Terry McAulay; Reggie Smith (select games); Spanish commentators: Miguel Gurwitz (play-by-play); Rolando Cantú (color commentator); Studio: Maria Taylor; Mike Tomlin
- Theme music composer: John Williams (2006–2011) & Joel Beckerman (Super Bowl XLVI–present) (main theme)
- Opening theme: "Waiting All Day for Sunday Night" by P!nk (2006), Faith Hill (2007–2012) and Carrie Underwood (2013–present)
- Composers: Joan Jett; Desmond Child
- Country of origin: United States
- Original language: English
- No. of seasons: 21 (through 2026 season)
- No. of episodes: 414

Production
- Executive producer: Fred Gaudelli (2006–2023)
- Producers: Rob Hyland; Matt Casey
- Production locations: Various NFL stadiums (game telecasts and Super Bowl pre-game, halftime and post-game shows); NBC Sports Headquarters; Stamford, Connecticut (pre-game, halftime and post-game shows)
- Camera setup: Multi-camera
- Running time: 210 minutes or until game ends (inc. adverts)
- Production companies: National Football League; NBC Sports

Original release
- Network: NBC; Peacock; Telemundo, TeleXitos and Universo (Spanish audio/broadcast)
- Release: August 6, 2006 – present

Related
- Football Night in America; NFL on NBC; NBC Sunday Night Movie; ESPN Sunday Night Football

NBC Sunday Night Football (abbreviated as SNF) is an American weekly television broadcast of National Football League (NFL) games on NBC and Peacock in the United States. It began airing on August 6, 2006, with the Pro Football Hall of Fame Game, which opened that year's preseason. NBC took over the rights to the Sunday prime time game telecasts from ESPN, which carried the broadcasts from 1987 to 2005. At the same time, ESPN began broadcasting Monday Night Football when it was dropped from sister network ABC which later returned in 2020. Previously, NBC had aired American Football League (AFL), and later American Football Conference (AFC), games from 1965 until 1997, when CBS took over those rights.

During the 2011–12 season, Sunday Night Football became the first sports program to hold the position as Nielsen's most-watched program on American network television during the year, beating American Idol, which held that honor for eight consecutive seasons beginning in 2004; Sunday Night Football repeated this feat three years running, beginning with the 2013–14 season.

Upon NBC's assumption of the Sunday prime-time game rights, Al Michaels, John Madden, Fred Gaudelli, and Drew Esocoff, who served as the respective play-by-play announcer, color commentator, lead producer, and director, joined SNF in the same positions they held during the latter portion of the ABC era of Monday Night Football. Madden retired prior to the 2009 season, and was succeeded in that role by Cris Collinsworth. Mike Tirico succeeded Michaels following Super Bowl LVI in February 2022.

Since 2014, sister cable channel Universo has carried Spanish-language simulcasts of select games, after years of aborted attempts to simulcast the games on Telemundo. As with the NFL's other television partners, NBC provides Spanish-language audio feed of the game broadcasts via second audio program (SAP), formerly noted as being "provided by Telemundo" before the rebranding of that entity's sports division to Telemundo Deportes. With the former mun2's relaunch on February 1, 2015, Universo began to carry the full season with the start of the 2015 season and simulcast Super Bowl XLIX, the channel carrying Spanish-language simulcasts of NFL games and NBC Sports properties. Telemundo would later carry Spanish language broadcasts of select games, beginning in 2021, with an NFL Wild Card game. Telemundo also broadcast Super Bowl LVI in 2022. Recently, TeleXitos has been a near simulcast of Universo programming at all hours and as a result has shown the football broadcasts.

== Studio show ==
NBC's broadcast begins at 7 p.m. Eastern Time with its pre-game show, which runs until kickoff (which usually occurs around 8:20 p.m. Eastern). The show serves the same purpose as NFL Primetime did for ESPN, offering recaps of the early action as well as a preview of the game to come. The show, hosted by Maria Taylor, with analysts Jason Garrett, Devin McCourty, and Mike Tomlin, emanates from the game site. Insider Mike Florio appears from home but appears on-site during select weeks. NBC News' Steve Kornacki appears from NBC's Stamford, CT studios. Tirico, Collinsworth, and Stark will also appear.

In 2021, a post-game show began airing on NBC's Peacock streaming service under the name Peacock Sunday Night Football Final. Originally hosted by Kathryn Tappen and Chris Simms, it is currently hosted by Jac Collinsworth, Garrett, and McCourty.

== Contract ==
NBC's current NFL contract, which runs from the 2023 season until the 2034 season, includes the rights to the season-opening Thursday night NFL Kickoff Game, another primetime game played on Thanksgiving Night, and at least two playoff games, one in the Wild Card round and one in the Divisional Playoffs, along with an additional Wild Card playoff game in 2023, 2026 and 2031 seasons. NBC will also air a Sunday primetime Wild Card game for 7 years from 2021 to 2027. NBC rotates the rights to the Super Bowl with other NFL television rights holders, obtaining the rights in 2026 (for Super Bowl LX), 2030 (for Super Bowl LXIV), and 2034 (for Super Bowl LXVIII), all in Winter Olympic years. Between 2006 and 2014, NBC also had rights to the Pro Bowl but lost it to ESPN/ABC from 2015 onward.

Between 2023 and 2028, NBC has the rights to one additional regular-season game to be exclusively aired on Peacock. In 2023, this was a matchup between the Buffalo Bills and the Los Angeles Chargers and the fourth quarter was presented commercial-free. In 2024, Peacock aired the Week 1 game between the Green Bay Packers and the Philadelphia Eagles on the Friday night following the Kickoff Game – in a matchup that was the first ever NFL fixture in Brazil. The NFL's media contract provides the rights for one Wild Card playoff game to be exclusively streamed and Peacock obtained the rights to air one during 2023–24 season in addition to the 2 Wild Card games NBC already had under the contract, which was a matchup between the Chiefs and the Dolphins. From 2024 onwards, the exclusive streaming playoff game will be aired by Amazon Prime. All NBC NFL games on television are streamed on Telemundo Deportes in Spanish.

NBC is the current home of the annual Pro Football Hall of Fame Game, which begins the NFL's preseason each August. Usually, the game is aired on the Sunday after the Hall of Fame Induction Ceremony the night before. In 2017, the game was moved to the Thursday before the Induction Ceremony, which made the game the official start of Hall of Fame Weekend. Due to NBC's broadcast commitments to the Summer Olympics, in every year the games are held, the Hall of Fame Game is moved to another network – Fox in 2021 and ESPN/ABC in 2024. In Summer Olympics years, NBC hosts another preseason game in lieu of the Hall of Fame Game, generally in the last week of the preseason schedule. In 2021, this was a matchup between the Atlanta Falcons and the Cleveland Browns, and in 2024, it was a matchup between the New England Patriots and the Washington Commanders.

== Scheduling ==
=== Opening game ===
The first regular season game to be shown by NBC under this contract, between the Miami Dolphins and the Pittsburgh Steelers, aired on September 7, 2006, followed by the first Sunday-night game – between the Indianapolis Colts and the New York Giants – on September 10, 2006. The actual first game of the run – the 2006 Pro Football Hall of Fame Game between the Oakland Raiders and the Philadelphia Eagles – was televised on August 6, 2006, also on NBC.

=== Thanksgiving ===
The first Thanksgiving game to be shown by NBC, between the New England Patriots and the New York Jets (a.k.a. the Butt Fumble game), aired on November 22, 2012. Prior to then, the primetime Thanksgiving game aired on NFL Network via Thursday Night Football between 2006 and 2011.

=== Super Bowl ===
The first Super Bowl to be shown by NBC under this contract, Super Bowl XLIII, between the Pittsburgh Steelers and Arizona Cardinals, aired on February 1, 2009.

=== Flexible scheduling ===
NBC Sunday Night Football is the beneficiary of the league's flexible-scheduling system. Since the NFL considers SNF to be its featured game of the week, for the final seven weeks of the season (seven of the final eight weeks during the 2006, 2011, 2016, 2017, 2022, and 2023 seasons because of Christmas weekend), the NFL has the flexibility in selecting games that are more intriguing and typically have playoff implications to air on Sunday night.

== Similarities to ABC's NFL coverage ==
Much of NBC's SNF production crew comes from ABC/ESPN, including Fred Gaudelli and Drew Esocoff (who respectively serve as producer and director of the broadcasts), as ESPN moved most of its previous Sunday night crew over to Monday Night Football. Michaels, Madden and Andrea Kremer also came to NBC directly from ABC/ESPN, and Football Night in America's Sterling Sharpe was a member of ESPN's Sunday NFL Countdown in recent years (calling several Sunday night games for ESPN in 2005). With regard to using ABC/ESPN talent, NBC Sports chairman Dick Ebersol said, "I was not interested in the quote, unquote vanity of starting anew ... There's not a lot of room for experimentation."

In addition, NBC has the starters for each team introduce themselves on each side of the ball (though the strict "player name/position/playing college" introductions of the past have been relaxed, and now players can list their birthplace or high school in the last part rather than their playing college, or even their college's common nickname, such as Miami (FL)'s "The U"), much as ABC did in the last few years of its run, and the short post-game show (done to allow affiliates to start their late newscasts) follows a similar format to ABC's. NBC also used this practice on NBC-produced Thursday Night Football broadcasts on NBC and/or NFL Network. These introductions would serve as the basis for the famous East/West Bowl sketch on the television series Key & Peele. Beginning in 2025, NBC would also use the player introductions for their NBA coverage, however, they would only be used for the visiting team.

Michaels and Madden ended each telecast in the 2007 and 2008 NFL seasons by selecting an MVP for that night's game to receive the Horse Trailer award (with a photo of each recipient being affixed to the side of a production truck, also known as a "horse trailer"). This concept originated from Madden's days with CBS, where he invented the similar "Turkey Leg Award" for the Thanksgiving Day game in 1989 (he later took the concept to Fox, then expanded it to every game of the year with the Horse Trailer Award when he joined ABC in 2002). In the 2006 season, the MVP concept was modified slightly, where the game's MVP was called the "Rock Star of the Game" and had his photo placed on a display at the "Top of the Rock" observation deck atop 30 Rockefeller Plaza, NBC's New York headquarters, in New York. When Madden retired following Super Bowl XLIII, the Horse Trailer Player of the Game award was discontinued.

== Theme music ==
Academy Award winner John Williams composed the instrumental theme music, titled "Wide Receiver", for Sunday Night Football. For Super Bowl XLIII, NBC commissioned Joel Beckerman of Man Made Music to create new instrumental cues adding techno and rock elements around the main brass melody. These cues replaced the original Williams arrangements full-time at the start of the 2009 season.

In 2006, singer-songwriter Pink reworked the lyrics of the Joan Jett song "I Hate Myself for Loving You" into a Sunday Night Football theme song, retitled "Waiting All Day for Sunday Night". Pink also performed the theme song for the 2006 season. Several alternative versions were used throughout the season, substituting different lyrics when appropriate (such as "Waiting All Year For Opening Night" (During the Kickoff game of each season), "Waiting All Year for Sunday Night" (for Week 1 SNF games), or "Waiting All Day For A Wild Card Fight").

In 2007, country singer Faith Hill replaced Pink as the singer of the opening theme, and a new arrangement of the Joan Jett song coincided with her debut. The Faith Hill intro, in particular, was not without criticism and parody. The intro was lampooned in the October 9, 2010, episode of Saturday Night Live, with host Jane Lynch as Hill (with Jason Sudeikis as Al Michaels and Bill Hader as Cris Collinsworth). In the 30 Rock episode "Season 4", the character of Jenna Maroney (Jane Krakowski) sings what appears to be an allusion to the Faith Hill intro for NBC's fictional Tennis Night in America program. In the South Park episode entitled "Faith Hilling", Eric Cartman sings an obvious spoof of Hill's actual Sunday Night Football song. On April 15, 2013, Hill announced that she would no longer sing the intro song for Sunday Night Football.

The use of the reworked Joan Jett song is another similarity to ABC's Monday Night Football coverage. From 1989 to 2011 and again beginning in 2017, Hank Williams Jr. opens MNF with a reworking of his song "All My Rowdy Friends Are Coming Over Tonight" entitled "All My Rowdy Friends Are Back for Monday Night (Are You Ready for Some Football?)".

On October 7, 2012, The Soul Rebels had a featured performance on Sunday Night Football, performing the show's theme song.

It was announced May 7, 2013, that Carrie Underwood would take over singing the theme song.

A new Carrie Underwood-sung theme known as "Oh, Sunday Night", which takes elements from her 2014 duet hit with Miranda Lambert, "Somethin' Bad", premiered with the opening game of the 2016 season on September 11.

For NBC's coverage of Thursday Night Football in 2016 and 2017, A capella group Pentatonix sang the opening theme song called "Weekend Go". The song is a reworked version of their original song "Sing". NBC also used the TNF main theme music called "Can't Hold Us Down", performed by members of the Broadway orchestra for Hamilton.

In 2018, Underwood, along with songwriters Chris DeStefano and Brett James, wrote and recorded a brand new song for SNF, called "Game On", replacing "Oh, Sunday Night", which had been the opening theme since 2016. In addition, Joel Beckerman, who had orchestrated the main theme since Super Bowl XLIII, reorchestrated the main theme, for the first time since Super Bowl XLVI. The previous orchestration of the SNF theme continues to be heard on air, mostly during in-game promotions for the game being broadcast the next week.

Underwood faced criticism over the song, which led to her, NBC, and the NFL being sued by singer Heidi Merrill for plagiarism. NBC followed this up by reinstating "Waiting All Day for Sunday Night" as the opening theme for the first time since 2015. Underwood returned, and in 2019, the open featured Joan Jett, and her band The Blackhearts. The open was shot inside of Mercedes-Benz Stadium, which was the first time that the SNF open was shot inside of an NFL stadium, instead of a soundstage. Underwood later returned to filming in soundstages in 2020 and 2021 due to the COVID-19 pandemic. Then from 2022 on, due to her residency, Underwood filmed the opening from the Resorts World Las Vegas Theatre.

Similar approaches to "Waiting All Day for Sunday Night" have been made for other NBC Sports platforms. In 2023, NBC introduced a cover of "Here Comes Saturday Night", originally sung by Italian band Giuda and performed by rock band Fall Out Boy, as their opening intro for their primetime college football games. The instrumental version of the song is also heard as the main theme for primetime games. A few years later, as part of the network's new Sunday Night Basketball coverage, NBC created a reworked version of Elvis Presley's song, A Little Less Conversation, with Lenny Kravitz performing in the intro, airing primarily for NBA games but also airing for WNBA games. NBC also created a new opening intro for Sunday Night Baseball broadcasts using the song, Karn Evil 9 by Emerson, Lake, and Palmer, featuring country band Zac Brown Band.

== Show opening ==
The song is at the centerpiece of the opening montage, which has changed several times over the years.

For the first season, Pink appeared to sing from the top of a skyscraper as a helicopter zoomed down on a city skyline with enlarged players Shaun Alexander, LaDainian Tomlinson and Tom Brady and the field, the results of computer-generated imagery. A television monitor, which resembles the monitor at Times Square leased at the time by NBC, showed game preview footage and opening credits.

In 2007 Faith Hill replaced Pink as the theme song's performer. Her initial intro featured her singing on a stage while some of the key players in the game and announcers Al Michaels and John Madden arrived in limousines and walk on a red carpet as they head to a simulated theater.

Carrie Underwood became the performer for the theme song for the 2013 season, replacing Faith Hill. Her intro debuted on September 8, 2013.

== Graphics ==
=== 2006–2008 ===
The 2008 variation of the 2006–2022 logo.

The graphics, logos and scoreboard for NBC's Sunday Night Football telecasts were designed by Troika Design Group, along with the city skyline graphics used in the introductions to both Football Night in America and the games proper. It was effectively the first time NBC used permanent time/score boxes throughout any of their sports broadcasts outside of Olympic Games broadcasts, where permanent scoring displays were compulsory; prior to 2006, NBC continued the previous mode of presenting the scores on-screen for a short time every few minutes or so, a method common in American sports broadcasting until Fox introduced constant scoring displays in 1994.

NBC's game telecasts use the same type of horizontal bottom-screen scoreboard that Monday Night Football used in the 2005 NFL season (and was subsequently used by ABC Sports until its rebranding in August 2006). After its debut, the graphics also began to be phased in across other NBC Sports properties, including its coverage of Notre Dame football and the annual Bayou Classic game (which uses exactly the same graphics used on SNF broadcasts), National Hockey League coverage (which uses the SNF graphics but with a scoreboard on the top), and tennis and golf (which use a modified version influenced by the look, but with bolder text for readability purposes). NBC's Olympics coverage continues to use a different package mixed between NBC's graphics and those of the IOC's world feed. The NBC football graphics are also used, in some form or another, on certain locally produced preseason telecasts carried by NBC owned-and-operated stations and affiliates that serve as flagship outlets for NFL teams (such as New York Giants preseason games on WNBC, and the Minnesota Vikings on KARE-TV).

=== 2009–2011 ===
NBC's bottom-line scoring banner underwent a significant revamp for the 2009 season, although it debuted during NBC's Super Bowl XLIII coverage on February 1, 2009. The changes included presenting downs and yardage in a feather derived from NBC's iconic peacock logo in the colors of the team currently on offense. In addition, when a team scores a touchdown, the banner will open, the team's logo and initials will slide to the left of the banner and "TOUCHDOWN" is displayed in the remainder of the banner. After a few moments, the banner will show the drive information. Then the banner returns to normal and show the change in the team's score. Additionally (beginning with Week 9), timeout indicators were added below each team's respective scores. For the 2010 season, the timeout indicators were changed to three white trapezoids below the team abbreviations, and the play clock was moved from above the team in possession of the football to above the game clock (for the final two minutes of regulation and if necessary, overtime). The down markers also changed in 2010, which is now featuring the team logo next to the down marker.

=== 2012–2014 ===
On January 2, 2012, during the NHL Winter Classic (with a sneak two days before during a Notre Dame hockey game on Versus), the graphics of all of NBC Sports' productions were updated to a new package intended to unify the graphical image between both NBC and the rebranded NBC Sports Network, which relaunched that same day. Subsequently, on Wild Card Saturday (January 7), NBC's NFL presentation was changed to the new graphical styling to match the style and layout of the then-recently christened NBC Sports Network. Most of the banner's styling remains the same, but with a cleaner and larger font for readability and a more neutral NBC logo to the left rather than the "aggressive peacock" used since 2006. Elements such as team and individual player stats take on team colors (main color as the background, secondary color as the accent), and the down/yardage/possession graphic also takes on team coloring, with neutral team comparison stats and other elements having a gold/blue/black coloring. Additionally, the play clock appeared directly above the game clock throughout the entire game.

Beginning with the 2014 Hall of Fame Game on August 3, 2014, the play clock was moved to the right side, next to the down/yardage graphic, of the bottom-screen score banner, which itself remained in the 4:3 safe area. In addition, beginning with the NFL Kickoff Special on September 4, 2014, an electronic green-colored line-of-scrimmage marker was added to the virtual on-field graphic. NBC's Sunday Night Football was also the last of the five NFL broadcast partners to switch to a full 16:9 letterbox presentation on its 4:3 standard-definition feed, a downscaled version of the HD feed's native 16:9 format (utilizing the Active Format Description #10 flag), following Fox (2010), ESPN's Monday Night Football (2011), NFL Network's Thursday Night Football (2012) and CBS (2013). Some of the graphics were also re-positioned.

=== 2015–2017 ===
On January 3, 2015, during the Wild Card playoffs, Sunday Night Football introduced a refresh of NBC Sports' graphics that was first launched on January 1, carrying a brighter visual appearance. A dedicated graphics package was introduced specifically for NBC-produced Thursday Night Football games during its tenure as a rightsholder.

=== 2018–2021 ===
NBC debuted a new graphics package specifically for Sunday Night Football during Super Bowl LII (utilizing a larger, parallelogram-shaped scorebar with a darker and more metallic appearance), which began to be used full-time in the 2018 season. Producer Fred Gaudelli stated that NBC wanted SNF to have a more distinctive presentation to set them apart from other NBC Sports telecasts.

For the 2018 season, NBC also debuted a new on-air feature known as the "green zone"; on third and fourth downs, the distance from the line of scrimmage to the first down line is digitally shaded on the field to be a darker shade of green. The feature received mixed reviews from critics and viewers, who considered it distracting and redundant to the existing yellow first down line that had historically been a standard feature of U.S. football telecasts. The Ringer's Rodger Sherman considered it "the ultimate conclusion of graphics creep". Gaudelli stated that the green zone was developed for when Skycam is used as a primary camera angle, but it was decided to use the effect on all games.

=== 2022–2025 ===
NBC debuted a new on-air graphics package for Sunday Night Football during Super Bowl LVI, including a "pod"-like scoreboard in the center of the screen (reminiscent of one introduced by Fox in 2020, and one initially used by Monday Night Football upon its move to ESPN) anchored by a circular hub containing the game clock and NBC logo, and the team names and scores shown in opposing directions to the left and right. It is capable of retracting itself to the side of the screen to fit statistical graphics. For the first time, NBC also introduced a new logo for Sunday Night Football and its associated programs, replacing the previous pentagon-shaped "shield" logo used since its premiere with a more minimalistic wordmark better-suited for multi-platform usage. The new logo also soft launched a refresh of the network's long-time peacock logo, whose official rollout began in earnest in late-December 2022.

A variant of these graphics with a more rectangular appearance were adopted by NBC's college football broadcasts (which had continued to use the 2015 graphics since) in 2023, coinciding with the debut of its new Big Ten Saturday Night broadcasts. A version of them would, in turn, also be adapted by the NBC Sports Regional Networks.

=== 2026–present ===
In January 2026, during the Wild Card Playoffs, NBC introduced an updated graphics package for its NFL coverage ahead of Super Bowl LX; the new scoreboard is a refresh of the 2022–2025 version (maintaining the same general layout and a nearly-identical circular "hub"), albeit with the rectangular segments used to display team names replaced by longer and slimmer versions with curved outer edges.

== International broadcasts ==
In Canada, Sunday Night Football is aired by TSN, as well as CTV 2 for simsub purposes since the 2017 season under the NFL's current media rights. It is also aired in the UK by Sky Sports, corporate sibling to NBC since Comcast's acquisition of Sky, and in Australia by 7mate.

In Brazil, from 2006 to 2024, SNF was broadcast on ESPN Brasil, with the original English audio available as a separate feed via second audio program. Starting in 2025, "SNF" package was acquired by Grupo Globo, the biggest media conglomerate in Brazil. Everaldo Marques came back as play-by-play announcer and Antony Curti provides color commentary.

The Sunday Night Football telecasts are also aired in Latin America by ESPN Latin America, with Álvaro Martín as play-by-play announcer and Raúl Allegre providing color commentary.

In the Philippines, Sunday Night Football, alongside other primetime games, is aired by Premier Sports beginning with the 2021 season.

== Nielsen ratings ==
Season	Average viewership (in millions)	Rating	Share
2006	17.5	11.0	18
2007	16.0	10.0	16
2008	16.6	10.2	16
2009	19.4	11.7	19
2010	25.8	13.0	21
2011	21.5	12.9	20
2012	21.4	12.8	20
2013	21.495	12.8	21
2014	21.3	12.5	21
2015	22.5	13.0	22
2016	28.7	18.3	23
2017	18.2	10.3	20
2018	20.0	16.1	20
2019	20.5	11.3	26
2020	17.4	9.3	20
2021	19.3	9.9	23
2022	18.4	9.8	21
2023	19.8	10.2	20
2024	21.6	11.0	22
2025	23.5	12.0	
2026			
2027			

Through the first four weeks of the 2010 NFL season, Sunday Night Football had an average viewership of 22.9 million viewers, the most for the first four weeks of a prime time NFL package in 14 years (since ABC earned a 24.0 million average viewership in 1996 on four broadcasts of Monday Night Football).

The Washington Redskins–Dallas Cowboys game on December 30, 2012, was the highest-rated Sunday Night Football broadcast ever, earning 30.426 million viewers (22.074 million during the period from 8:31 to 11:25 p.m. Eastern Time) and a household rating of 12.7. This also made it the most watched regular-season primetime game in 16 years, since a November 18, 1996 Monday Night Football game on ABC between the Green Bay Packers and the Cowboys (which was watched by 31.5 million viewers).

For the 2013 season, Sunday Night Football averaged 21.9 million viewers (for 15 broadcasts, as well as the Turkey Bowl) in 2013, up 5% versus its viewership in 2012, and an increase of 3% with a 12.9 household rating. In terms of sheer reach, this marked the highest average viewership for an NFL prime time package since 1996. Its highest rated game telecast was the Denver Broncos and Indianapolis Colts on October 20, 2013, which was watched by 26.9 million viewers.

== See also ==
- NFL on NBC
- NFL on CBS
- NFL on Fox
- NFL on Westwood One Sports (Sunday Night Football on radio)
- Thursday Night Football

== Notes ==
Records
Preceded by ESPN Sunday Night Football	NFL Sunday Night Football broadcaster 2006–present	Succeeded by Incumbent
