= Thomas A. Edison Career and Technical Academy =

High school in Union County, New Jersey, US

Location
- 625 Summer Street; Elizabeth, Union County, New Jersey 07202; United States
- 40.6502°N 74.2126°W

Information
- Type: Public high school
- Established: 1935
- School district: Elizabeth Public Schools
- NCES School ID: 340459003045
- Principal: Danny Ortiz
- Faculty: 63.0 FTEs
- Grades: 9-12
- Enrollment: 816 (as of 2023–24)
- Student to teacher ratio: 13.0:1
- Campus: Urban
- Accreditation: Middle States Association of Colleges and Schools
- Website: edison.epsnj.org

The Thomas A. Edison Career and Technical Academy is a four-year public high school in Elizabeth in Union County, in the U.S. state of New Jersey, serving students in ninth through twelfth grades as part of the Elizabeth Public Schools. The school is the primary center for vocational and technical education in the city. Williams' Field, which holds the school's football field and outdoor track field, is adjacent to Thomas A. Edison Academy. The school is accredited by the Middle States Association of Colleges and Schools Commission on Elementary and Secondary Schools since 1946.

Thomas A. Edison High School was built in 1935 and named for the inventor who worked on many of his major contributions to the scientific and commercial world working in New Jersey.

As of the 2023–24 school year, the school had an enrollment of 816 students and 63.0 classroom teachers (on an FTE basis), for a student–teacher ratio of 13.0:1. There were 588 students (72.1% of enrollment) eligible for free lunch and 106 (13.0% of students) eligible for reduced-cost lunch.

== Awards, recognition and rankings ==
The school was the 323rd-ranked public high school in New Jersey out of 339 schools statewide in New Jersey Monthly magazine's September 2014 cover story on the state's "Top Public High Schools", using a new ranking methodology. The school had been ranked 327th in the state of 328 schools in 2012.

== Curriculum ==
The Thomas A. Edison Career and Technical Academy serves students in grades 9-12 divided into small learning communities. The program is designed to provide academic rigor as well as prepare students to learn a skilled trade. In addition to coursework in their chosen field of study, students complete a curriculum that includes classes in English, Mathematics, Science, Social Studies, and World Language.

The career and technical program comprises four themes:

- Construction Technology prepares students for a career in construction (carpentry; electrical trades; heating, ventilation, and air conditioning; and plumbing), architecture, and engineering
- Health Science prepares students for a career in patient care, nursing, radiology, medicine technology, and healthcare administration
- Automotive Technology prepares students for the latest in automotive diagnostics, mechanics, operations, and repairs
- Hospitality and Retail Services prepares students to enter into the management and marketing field, sales, customer service, entrepreneurship, restaurant management, and food service.

The Elizabeth Public Schools is partnering with The National Academy Foundation and has been engaged in a Year of Planning - Academy Development Process to establish the Academy of Hospitality & Tourism as a career academy at the Thomas A. Edison Career and Technical Academy in September 2010.

== Administration ==
The school's principal is Danny Ortiz. Core members of the school's administration include two vice principals.

== Notable alumni ==
- Marsha P. Johnson (1945–1992), a liberation activist and self-identified drag queen.
