= J. Christian Bollwage Finance Academy =

High school in Union County, New Jersey, US

Location
- 447 Richmond Street; Elizabeth, Union County, New Jersey 07202; United States
- 40.644437°N 74.2098868°W

Information
- Type: Public high school
- Established: 2011
- School district: Elizabeth Public Schools
- NCES School ID: 340459003389
- Principal: John Byrne
- Faculty: 30.0 FTEs
- Grades: 9-12
- Enrollment: 415 (as of 2024–25)
- Student to teacher ratio: 13.8:1
- Campus: Urban
- Website: bollwage.epsnj.org

J. Christian Bollwage Finance Academy is a four-year comprehensive public high school located in Elizabeth, in Union County, in the U.S. state of New Jersey, operating as part of Elizabeth Public Schools. The academy accepts students in ninth through twelfth grades in Elizabeth who have passed the requirements for enrollment. The academy is operated by the Elizabeth Board of Education.

As of the 2024–25 school year, the school had an enrollment of 415 students and 30.0 classroom teachers (on an FTE basis), for a student–teacher ratio of 13.8:1. There were 295 students (71.1% of enrollment) eligible for free lunch and 41 (9.9% of students) eligible for reduced-cost lunch.

== History ==
Established in 2011 as the Academy of Finance, it was renamed J. Christian Bollwage Finance Academy in 2017 for the longtime mayor of Elizabeth, who also has a parking garage and housing complex named in his honor.

== Administration ==
The school's principal is John Byrne. His core administrative team includes the vice principal.
