= NAF (non-profit organization) =

Educational non-profit organization

NAF (nonprofit organization)
- Formerly: National Academy Foundation
- Type: Non-profit organization
- Industry: Education
- Founded: 1980
- Founder: Sanford I. Weill
- Headquarters: New York, New York
- Number of locations: 620 academies
- Area served: 37 states, Washington D.C., the U.S. Virgin Islands and Puerto Rico
- Key people: Sanford I. "Sandy" Weill (Founder and Chairman); Lisa Dughi (CEO)
- Services: Public-private partnerships in key local sectors create academies within traditional high schools to create learning environments and internship opportunities in industries with jobs
- Subsidiaries: In 2002, Career Academies U.K. were the first affiliates set up outside the U.S.
- Website: NAF.org

NAF is an industry-sponsored nonprofit organization with a United-States-based network of public-private partnerships that support career academies within traditional high schools. Each academy focuses on a theme that addresses the anticipated future needs of local industry and the community it serves in five major "college prep plus" fields of study that encourage and facilitate college preparation and technical training on career paths in finance, hospitality and tourism, information technology (IT), engineering, and health sciences.

The program is designed to build a work-ready future workforce by emphasizing STEM-related industry-specific curricula in the classroom and work-based learning experience, including summer internships. NAF has created career academies in 620 high schools in high-need communities in the contiguous United States and its territories since 1980.

Numerous studies of the NAF model have concluded that "sustained, quality employer involvement in education is possible," and that their programming helps provide equitable opportunities for minority students in "low-socioeconomic and high-risk backgrounds." Other research also credits the work-study model with promoting successful equity and inclusion.

== Program ==
Characterized as "schools within schools," NAF academies serve a small community of students who are "organized as a cohort over their four years of high school" Academy teachers are typically skilled in both academic and the technical knowledge of the field in which the academy is focused. They are provided support with NAF professional development, training and curricula that integrates "core subject area content, career-themed content or technical education under a specified theme" ... based on NAF's input, that of CTE (Career Technical Education) and the local labor markets. Teachers meet often to coordinate the curriculum, take care of administrative details and are involved outside the classroom with local businesses and sponsors "to make learning relevant with real-world career support to build strong connections between school and work." The academies are typically run and taught by the same teachers for a number of semesters.

Summer internships of about six to eight weeks are a focal point of the academy programs, and usually pay the students for their work. During internships, the students spend some time training, often report to a school staff supervisor and sometimes have a workplace mentor. Seniors in the program combine work-based learning with corresponding curricular activities to learn more about the industry, and to "explore careers, plan for college, and develop their social and interpersonal skills."

== History ==
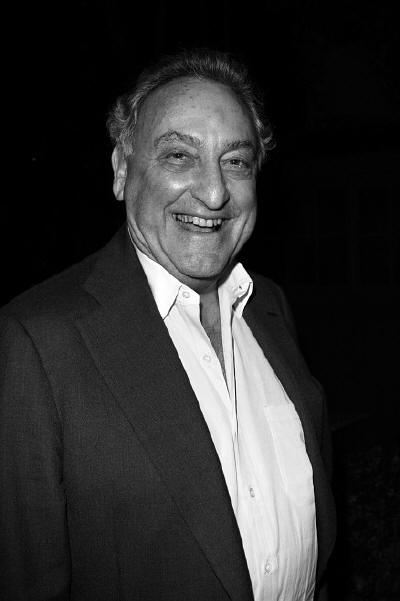
Sanford Weill, NAF founder and chairman, photographed in 2007.

In 1980, the first Academy of Finance opened in John Dewey High School in Brooklyn, New York, after the New York City Board of Education accepted Sanford I. Weill's proposal to address the disconnect between the need for skilled workforce talent and the lack of opportunity for young people in New York City by creating a public-private partnership in high schools that exposed young people to genuine career skills that traditional schools don't offer. As he later explained to the U.S. House Committee on Ways and Means when testifying on the benefits of the program:

You saw young people playing in the street, young people without having a clue of what life was about, and how they can become part of the system. That was the beginning of the idea that maybe the private sector should get together with the public sector and see if we can create a high-school level program that can expose young people for a career in the financial services industry.

Weill's initial program focused on finance, which was Weill's specialty. In 1987, NAF's launched a Hospitality and Tourism theme with the opening of two pilot Academies, one in Miami, Florida and another in Richmond Hill, New York, with support from the American Express Foundation. In 2000, NAF piloted a third theme, opening Academies of Information Technology in 12 high schools across the country with support from Lucent, AT&T Corporation, United Technologies, GTE/Verizon, Oracle, Computer Associates and Compaq. In 2007, NAF launched its fourth academy theme, the Academy of Engineering as a collaboration between NAF, Project Lead The Way (PLTW), and the National Action Council for Minorities in Engineering, Inc. (NACME) to provide underrepresented students with the knowledge and skills needed to succeed in STEM careers. Health Sciences, a theme launched in 2011–2012, quickly earned Academy of Health Sciences involvement to help prepare young people for careers in health.

In 2019, the NFL awarded eight social justice organizations, including NAF, with a $2 million grant for "reduc[ing] barriers to opportunity." In one high-profile example, it partnered with United Technologies in 2020, launching two $3 million engineering academies in high schools in Aguadilla, Puerto Rico.

NAF National Academy Network
Foundation Date	Academy Theme	Total Number
1980	Academy of Finance	193
1987	Hospitality and Tourism	88
2000	Information Technology	120
2007	Engineering	93
2011/12	Health Science	86
	Other	40
In 2020, NAF served 112,208 students in 37 states, Washington D.C., the U.S. Virgin Islands and Puerto Rico.		Total = 620

== Outcomes ==
There have been significant reports and statistics on the outcome of students from NAF's Career Academies. Milton Chen, author of Education Nation and former executive director for the George Lucas Educational Foundation, sums up the most recent reports:

- Graduates of NAF institutes earn on average of 11% more per year in the eight years after graduation than non-academy students.
- More than 90% of NAF students graduate high school, even though academies are located in urban areas where the average high school graduation rate is 50%.
- More than 50% of NAF's high school graduates earn bachelor's degrees in four years while the national average is only 32%.

In 2002, the first set of Career Academies outside the U.S. were set up in the United Kingdom by Career Academies UK, affiliated with NAF.

== Academies ==
- Academy of Engineering
- Academy of Finance
- Academy of Hospitality and Tourism
- Academy of Information Technology
- Academy of Health Sciences

=== Academy of Finance ===
The Academy of Finance (AOF) is an American educational program first established in 1982 by the NAF. It offers high school students an opportunity to study accounting, international trade, leadership, and the use of technology in preparing for college and the financial services industry.

NAF was created by Phyllis Frankfort, the Director of the Academy of Finance, in 1989. In 1981, she designed a program for the New York City Department of Education and for Shearson Lehman Brothers chaired by Sanford I. Weill. Her proposal for the "Institute for the Study of Finance" recommended a program for public high school students. Weill gave $100,000 to develop the program through Lehman Brothers' foundation, headed by D. Topol, which was matched by the New York City Board of Education. Frankfort designed and implemented the program and the first Academy of Finance opened at John Dewey High School in Brooklyn in 1982 with 35 students and grew to more than two hundred in 1984.

The program, which subsequently grew to be nationwide, was designed to introduce young people in New York City to potential careers in the financial services industry.

== See also ==
- National Academy Foundation School – a high school in Baltimore, Maryland based on NAF's school model.
