= Joe Weil =

American poet (born 1958)

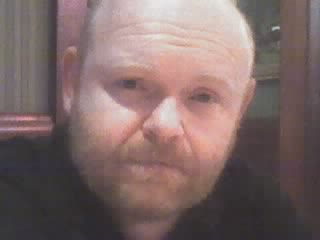
- New Jersey Bard at Poetry Reading
- Born: Joseph D. Weil; March 24, 1958 (age 68); Elizabeth, New Jersey
- Occupation: Professor at Binghamton University
- Spouse: Emily Vogel (2011 - Present)

Joseph D. Weil (born March 24, 1958) is an American poet. He currently teaches undergraduate and graduate creative writing classes at Binghamton University.

Weil grew up in Elizabeth, New Jersey and was described by The New York Times as personifying that town: "working-class, irreverent, modest, but open to the world and filled with a wealth of possibilities."

Weil's mother died of cancer when he was 17. Weil dropped out of Rutgers University to care for his ill father, a former boxer and glue-factory worker who became alcoholic. After his father's death, Weil became homeless. He found work in factories, and eventually found long-term work at National Tool.

Weil's latest book is "The Plumber's Apprentice," published in 2009 by New York Quarterly.

In 2008, Weil published two books of poetry, Painting the Christmas Trees (Texas A & M University Press) and What Remains (Nightshade Press). These books contain "Elegy for Sue Rapeezi," "Ode to Elizabeth," "Fists (for My Father)," "Morning at Elizabeth Arch," and "The Dead Are in My Living Room," which appeared in earlier chapbooks published by David Roskos of Iniquity Press/Vendetta books. The fall of 2008 saw Weil perform with Patricia Smith and Jan Beatty at the Geraldine R. Dodge poetry festival. Weil's poetry was also profiled in an NJPBS special, (see YouTube, Joe weil, NJPBS) a decade after he appeared on Bill Moyer's PBS documentary, "Fooling With Words."

== Works ==
- Ode to Elizabeth and Other Poems (Edited & Published by Dwyer Jones, 1995)
- I’ve Seen the Light (Herschel Silverman’s Beehive Press, 1997)
- 15 Cinquains for a Rainy Day or Two (Limited Edition of 50 Copies, Iniquity Press / Vendetta Books, 1998)
- In Praise We Enter (Rain Bucket Press, 1998)
- A Portable Winter (Introduction by Harvey Pekar, Iniquity Press / Vendetta Books, 1999)
- The Pursuit of Happiness: New and selected Poems from Elizabeth, New Jersey (Iniquity Press / Vendetta Books)
- Teaching the Dead (The Press Electrrrric!, online book, 2007)
- Painting the Christmas Trees (Texas Review Press, 2008)
- What Remains (Nightshade Press, 2008)
- The Plumbers Apprentice (NYQ Books, 2009
- The Great Grandmother Light (NYQ Books, 2013
- West of Home (with Emily Vogel, Blast Press, 2013)
- A Night in Duluth (NYQ Books, 2016
- Helping The Village Idiot Feed The Chickens: Poetry (Iniquity Press/Vendetta Books, 2020)
- The Backwards Year (NYQ Books, 2020
