= Elizabeth Township, New Jersey =

Coordinates: 40.671°N 74.211°W

Elizabeth Township, also called Elizabethtown, was a township that existed in Essex County, in the U.S. state of New Jersey, from 1664 until 1855. The town served as the first capital of New Jersey.

The area was initially part of the Elizabethtown Tract, purchased from the Lenape on October 28, 1664.

Elizabeth-Town Township was formed on October 31, 1693, while the area was still within Essex County. Elizabeth was incorporated as one of New Jersey's initial 104 townships by the Township Act of 1798 Act of the New Jersey Legislature on February 21, 1798. Portions of the township were taken to form Westfield Township (January 27, 1794), Springfield Township (April 14, 1794), Rahway Township (February 27, 1804) and Clinton Township (April 14, 1834).

On March 13, 1855, the City of Elizabeth was created, combining and replacing both Elizabeth Township and Elizabeth Borough. With the creation of the City of Elizabeth, Elizabeth Township was dissolved.
