= Elizabeth Borough, New Jersey =

Coordinates: 40.66°N 74.22°W

Elizabeth Borough was a borough that existed in Essex County, in the U.S. state of New Jersey, from 1740 until 1855.

== History ==
Elizabeth was established as a borough by Royal Charter on February 8, 1740, and was rechartered by the New Jersey Legislature on November 28, 1789.

Portions of the borough were taken to form Union Township (November 23, 1808) and Clinton Township (April 14, 1834).

On March 13, 1855, the City of Elizabeth was created, consolidating Elizabeth Borough and Elizabeth Township. With the creation of the City of Elizabeth, Elizabeth Township was dissolved.
