= Elizabeth, New Jersey =

City in New Jersey, United States

- City
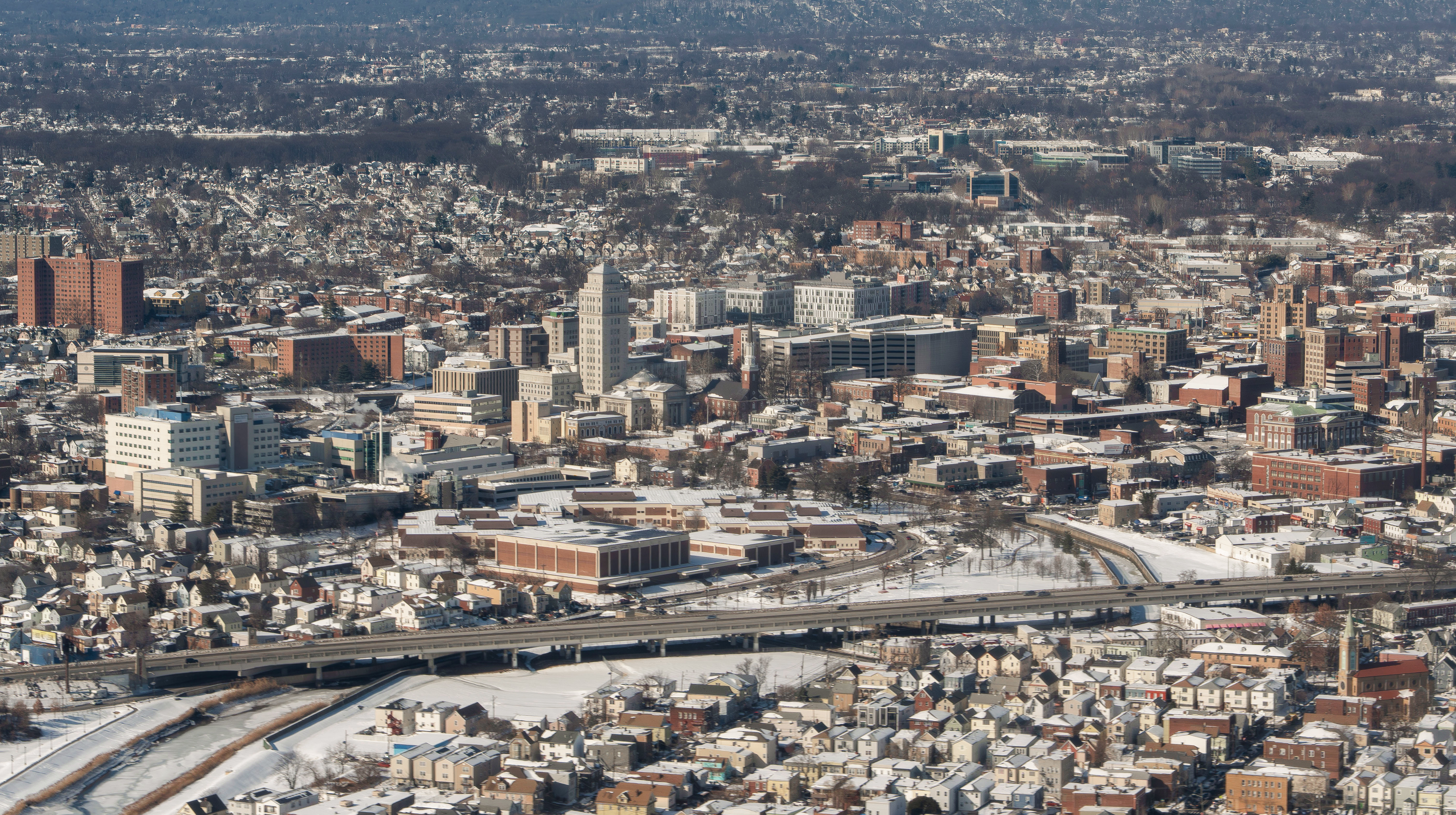
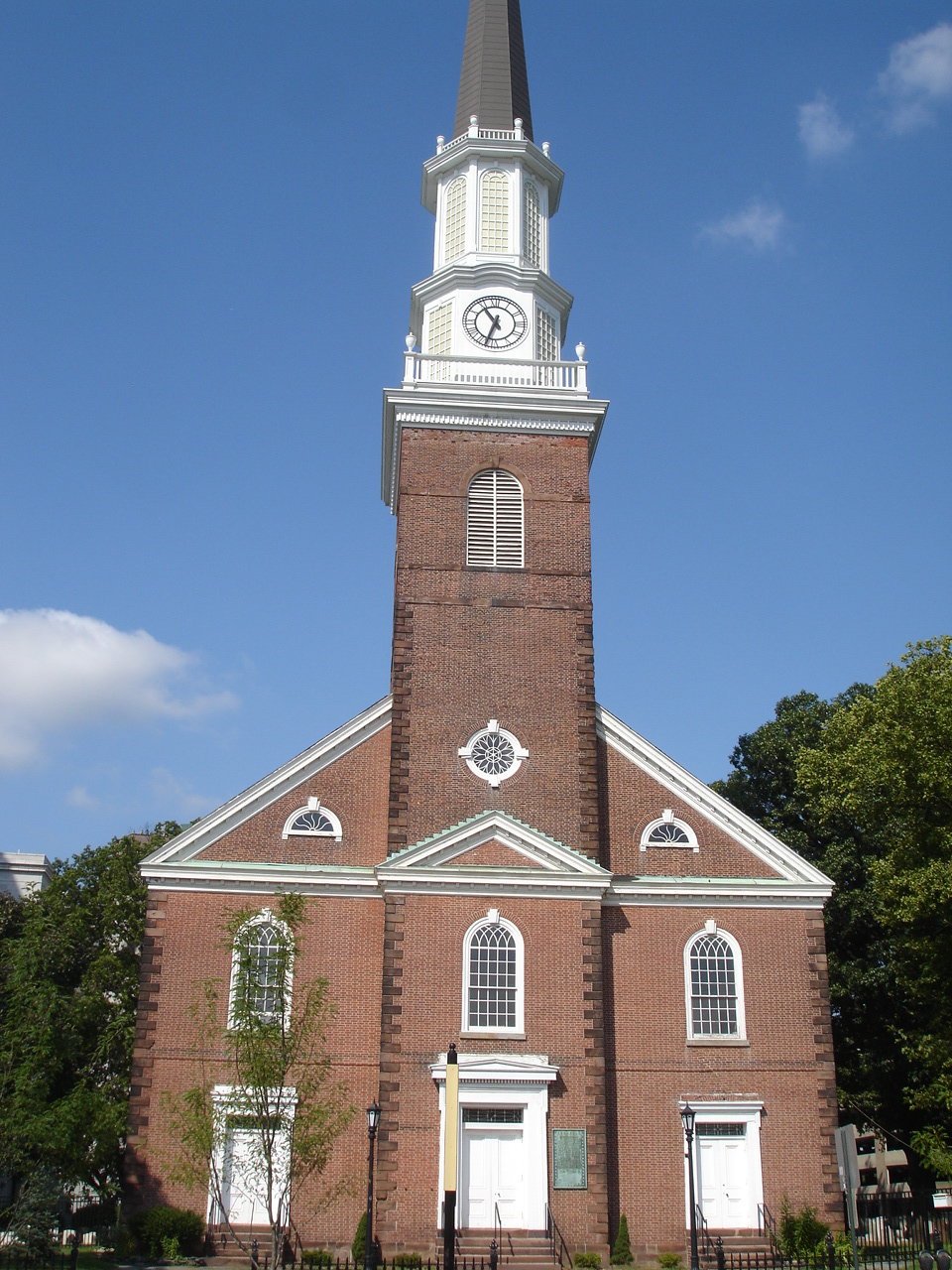
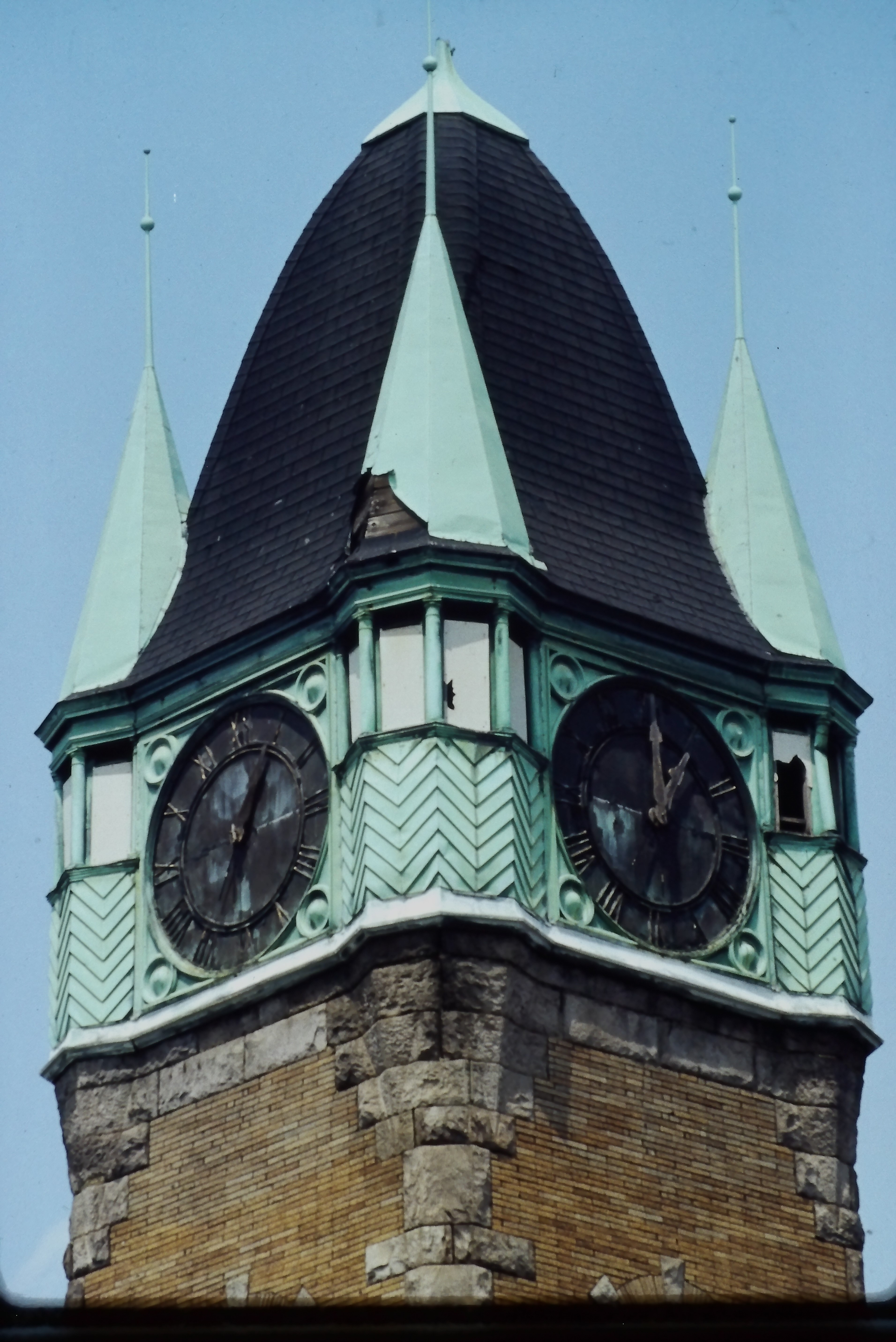
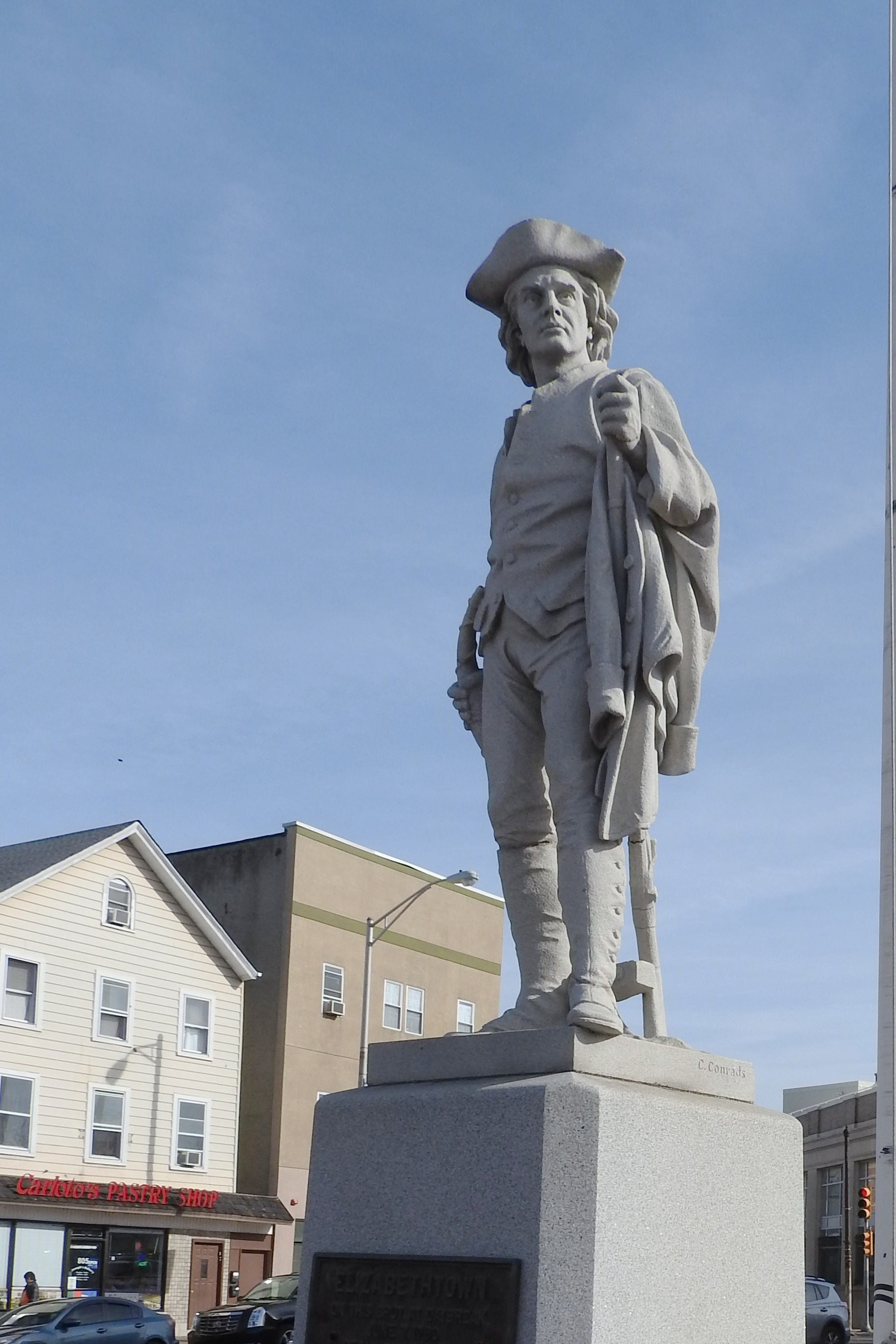
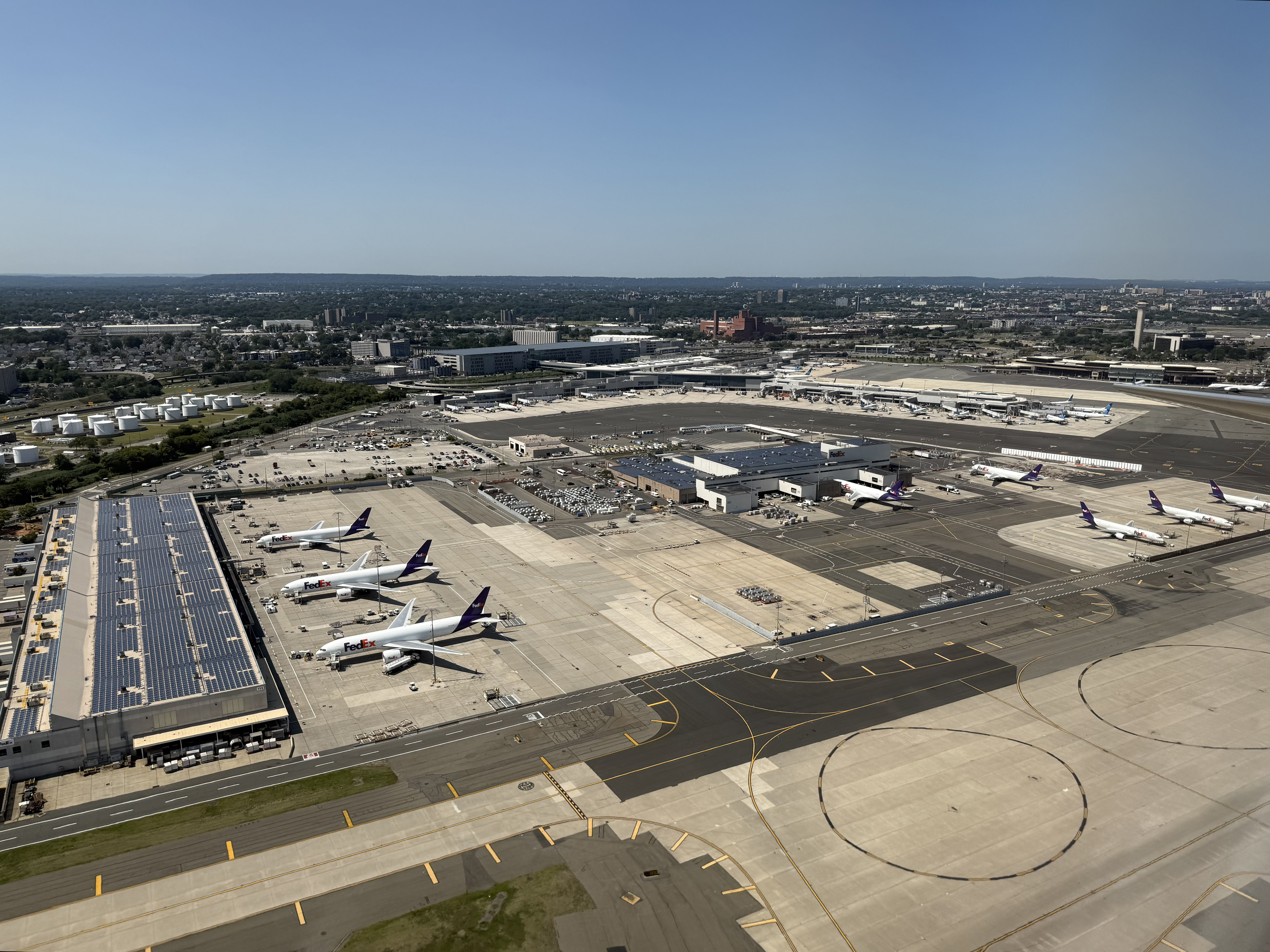
- Skyline of Elizabeth First Presbyterian Church Elizabeth station War Memorial Newark Liberty International Airport

- Flag Seal
- Motto: Loyal Devoir
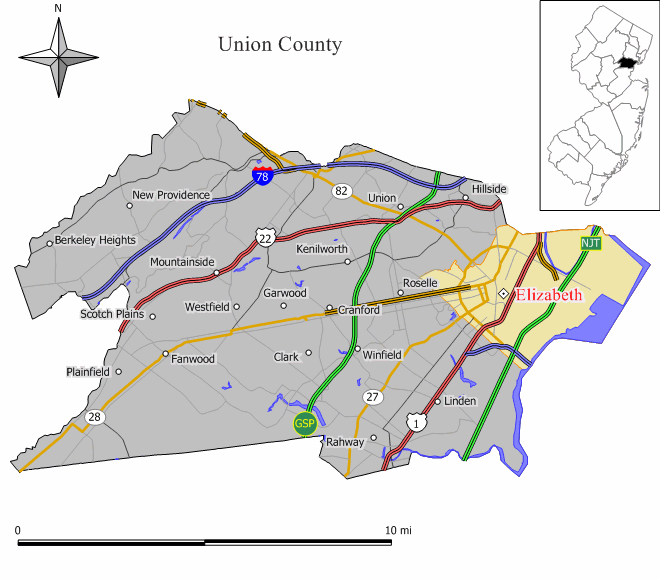
- Location of Elizabeth in Union County highlighted in yellow (center). Inset map: Location of Union County in New Jersey highlighted in black (upper right).

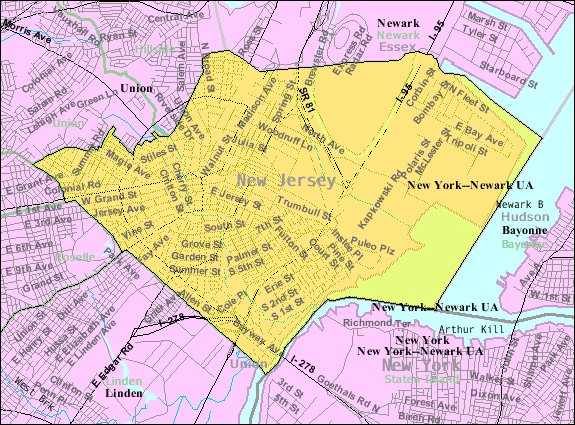
- Census Bureau map of Elizabeth, New Jersey

- Location of Elizabeth in Union County Location in New Jersey Location in the United States
- Coordinates: 40.663°N 74.214°W
- Country: United States
- State: New Jersey
- County: Union
- Founded: 1664
- Incorporated: March 13, 1855
- Named for: Elizabeth, wife of Sir George Carteret

Government
  - Type: Faulkner Act (mayor–council)
  - Body: City Council
  - Mayor: J. Christian "Chris" Bollwage (D, term ends December 31, 2028)
  - Administrator: Bridget S. Anderson
  - Municipal clerk: Yolanda Roberts

Area
  - Total: 13.64 sq mi (35.32 km^{2})
  - Land: 12.32 sq mi (31.91 km^{2})
  - Water: 1.32 sq mi (3.42 km^{2}) 9.78%
  - Rank: 180th of 565 in state 1st of 21 in county
- Elevation: 16 ft (4.9 m)

Population (2020)
  - Total: 137,298
  - Estimate (2025): 141,675
  - Rank: 199th in country (2025); 4th of 565 in state (2020); 5th in state (2025); 1st of 21 in county
  - Density: 11,145.4/sq mi (4,303.27/km^{2})
  - Rank: 32nd of 565 in state 2nd of 21 in county
- Time zone: UTC−05:00 (Eastern (EST))
  - Summer (DST): UTC−04:00 (Eastern (EDT))
- ZIP Codes: 07201: Union Square station 07202: Bayway station; 07206: Elizabethport station; 07207: P.O. Boxes; 07208: Elmora station
- Area code: 908
- FIPS code: 3403921000
- GNIS feature ID: 0885205
- Website: www.elizabethnj.org

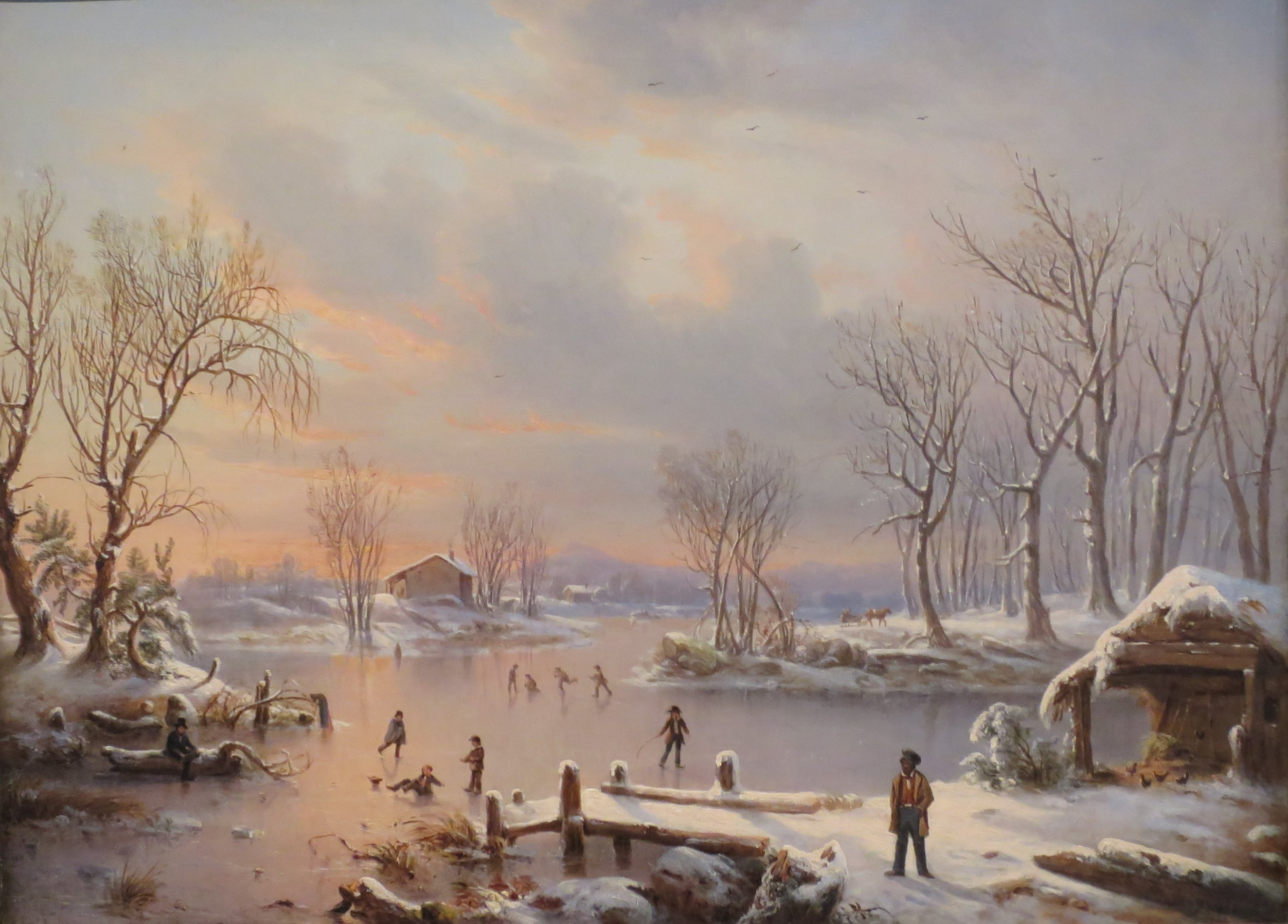
View Near Elizabethtown, N. J., oil painting by Régis François Gignoux, Honolulu Museum of Art

Elizabeth is a city in and the county seat of Union County, in the U.S. state of New Jersey. As of the 2020 United States census, the city retained its ranking as the state's fourth-most-populous city behind neighboring Newark, Jersey City and Paterson, with a population of 137,298, an increase of 12,329 (+9.9%) from the 2010 census count of 124,969, which in turn reflected an increase of 4,401 (3.7%) from the 120,568 counted in the 2000 census.

The Population Estimates Program calculated a population of 141,675 for 2025, making it the 199th-most populous city in the nation and the fifth-most populous municipality of any type in the state, falling behind Lakewood Township. (Note: Note that the Census Bureau excludes townships from its rankings of municipalities by population.)

== History ==
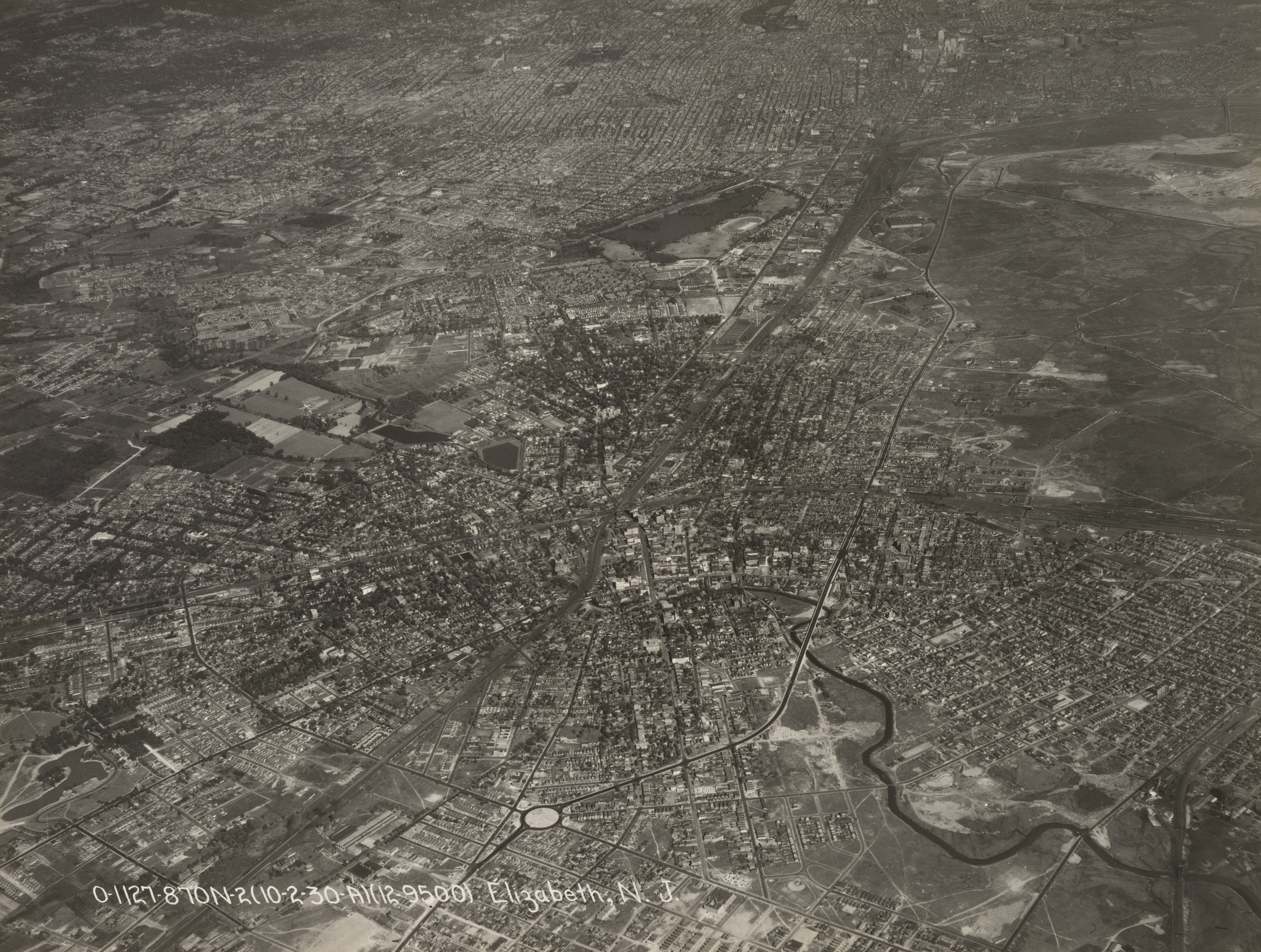
Aerial view of Elizabeth in 1931

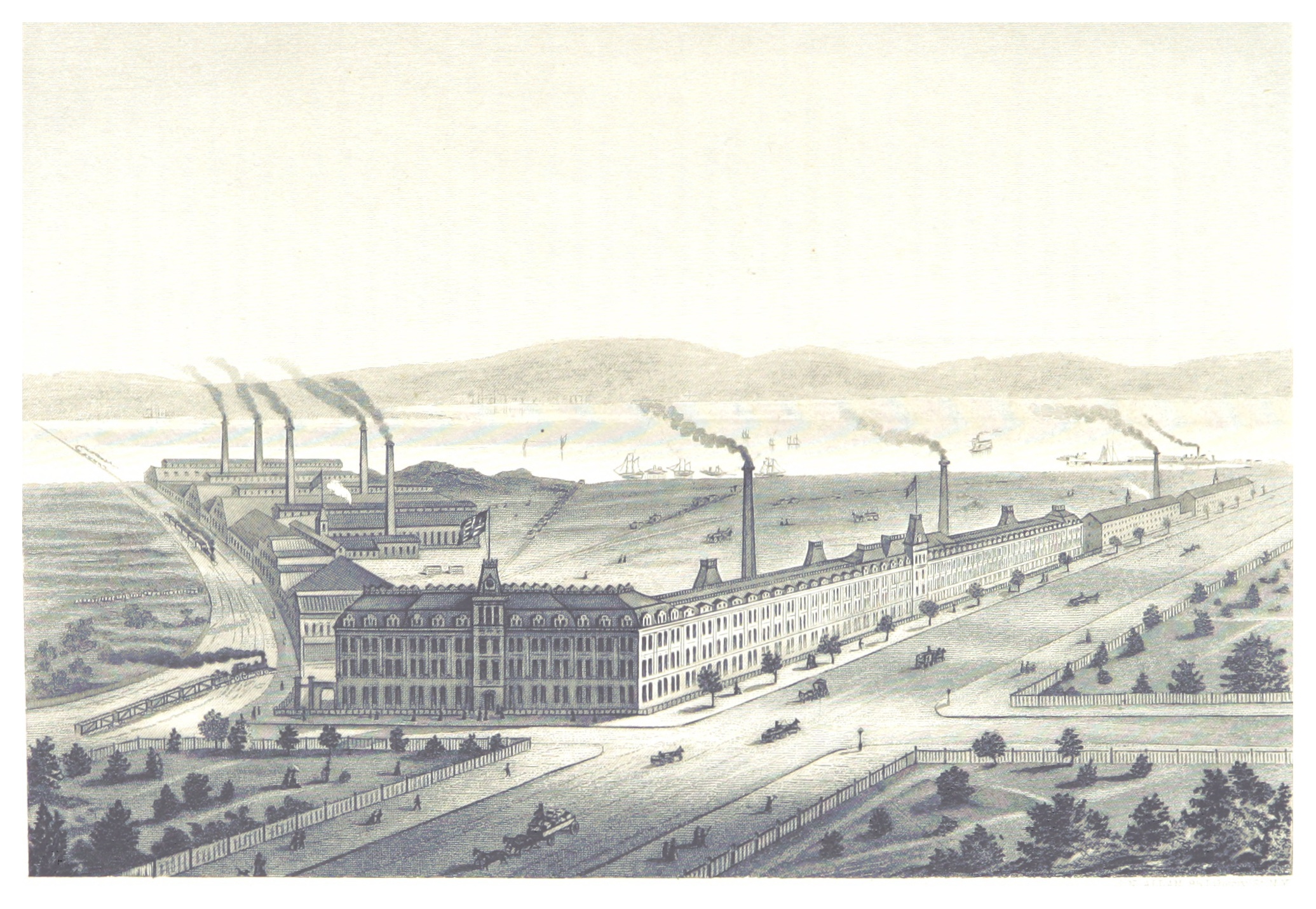
The Singer Sewing Machine Company's factory at Elizabethport, c. 1876

Elizabeth, originally called "Elizabethtown" and part of the Elizabethtown Tract, was founded in 1664 by English settlers. The town was not named for Queen Elizabeth I as many people may assume, but rather for Elizabeth, wife of Sir George Carteret, one of the two original Proprietors of the colony of New Jersey. She was the daughter of Philippe de Carteret II, 3rd Seigneur de Sark and Anne Dowse. The town served as the first capital of New Jersey.

During the American Revolutionary War, Elizabethtown was continually attacked by British forces based on Manhattan and Staten Island, culminating in the Battle of Springfield which decisively defeated British attempts to gain New Jersey. After independence, it was from Elizabethtown that George Washington embarked by boat to Manhattan for his 1789 inauguration. There are numerous memorials and monuments of the American Revolution in Elizabeth.

On March 13, 1855, the City of Elizabeth was created by an act of the New Jersey Legislature, combining and replacing both Elizabeth Borough (which dated back to 1740) and Elizabeth Township (which had been formed in 1693), subject to the results of a referendum held on March 27, 1855. On March 19, 1857, the city became part of the newly created Union County. Portions of the city were taken to form Linden Township on March 4, 1861.

The first major industry, the Singer Sewing Machine Company came to Elizabeth and employed as many as 2,000 people. In 1895, it saw one of the first car companies, when Electric Carriage and Wagon Company was founded to manufacture the Electrobat, joined soon by another electric car builder, Andrew L. Riker. The Electric Boat Company got its start building submarines for the United States Navy in Elizabeth, beginning with the launch of USS Holland (SS-1) in 1897. These pioneering naval craft (known as A-Class) were developed at Lewis Nixon's Crescent Shipyard in Elizabeth between the years 1896–1903. Elizabeth grew in parallel to its sister city of Newark for many years, but has been more successful in retaining a middle-class presence and was mostly spared riots in the 1960s.

== Geography ==
According to the U.S. Census Bureau, the city had a total area of 13.66 square miles (35.37 km^{2}), including 12.32 square miles (31.91 km^{2}) of land and 1.34 square miles (3.46 km^{2}) of water (9.78%).

Elizabeth is bordered to the southwest by Linden, to the west by Roselle and Roselle Park, to the northwest by Union and Hillside, to the north by Newark (in Essex County). To the east the city is across Newark Bay from Bayonne in Hudson County and the Arthur Kill from Staten Island, New York.

The borders of Elizabeth, Bayonne and Staten Island meet at one point on Shooters Island, of which 7.5 acres (3.0 ha) of the island is owned by Elizabeth, though the island is managed by the New York City Department of Parks and Recreation.

The Elizabeth River is a waterway that courses through the city for 4.2 miles (6.8 km) and is largely channelized, before draining into the Arthur Kill.

== Districts and neighborhoods ==
=== Midtown / Uptown ===
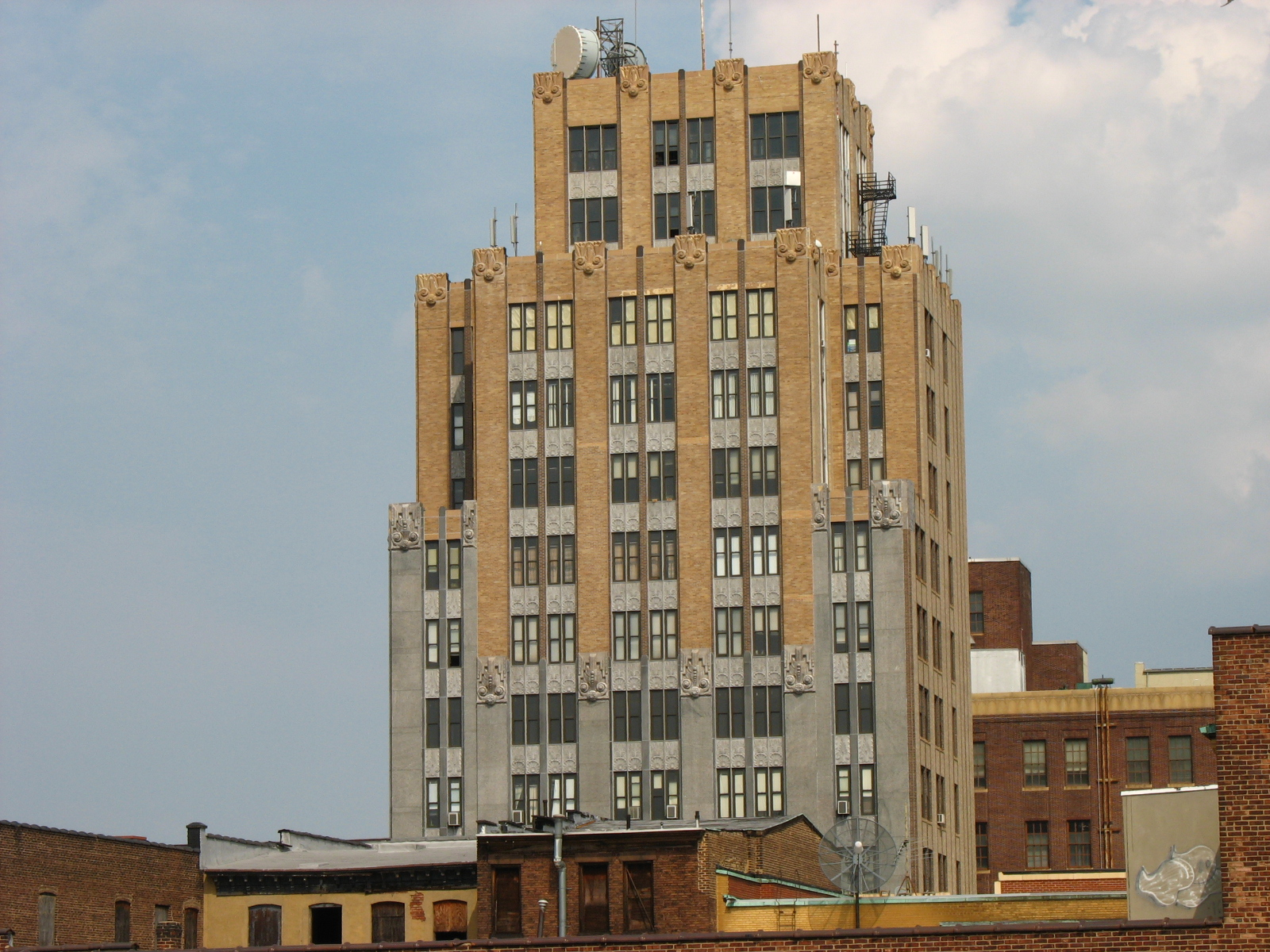
Art Deco Hersch Tower

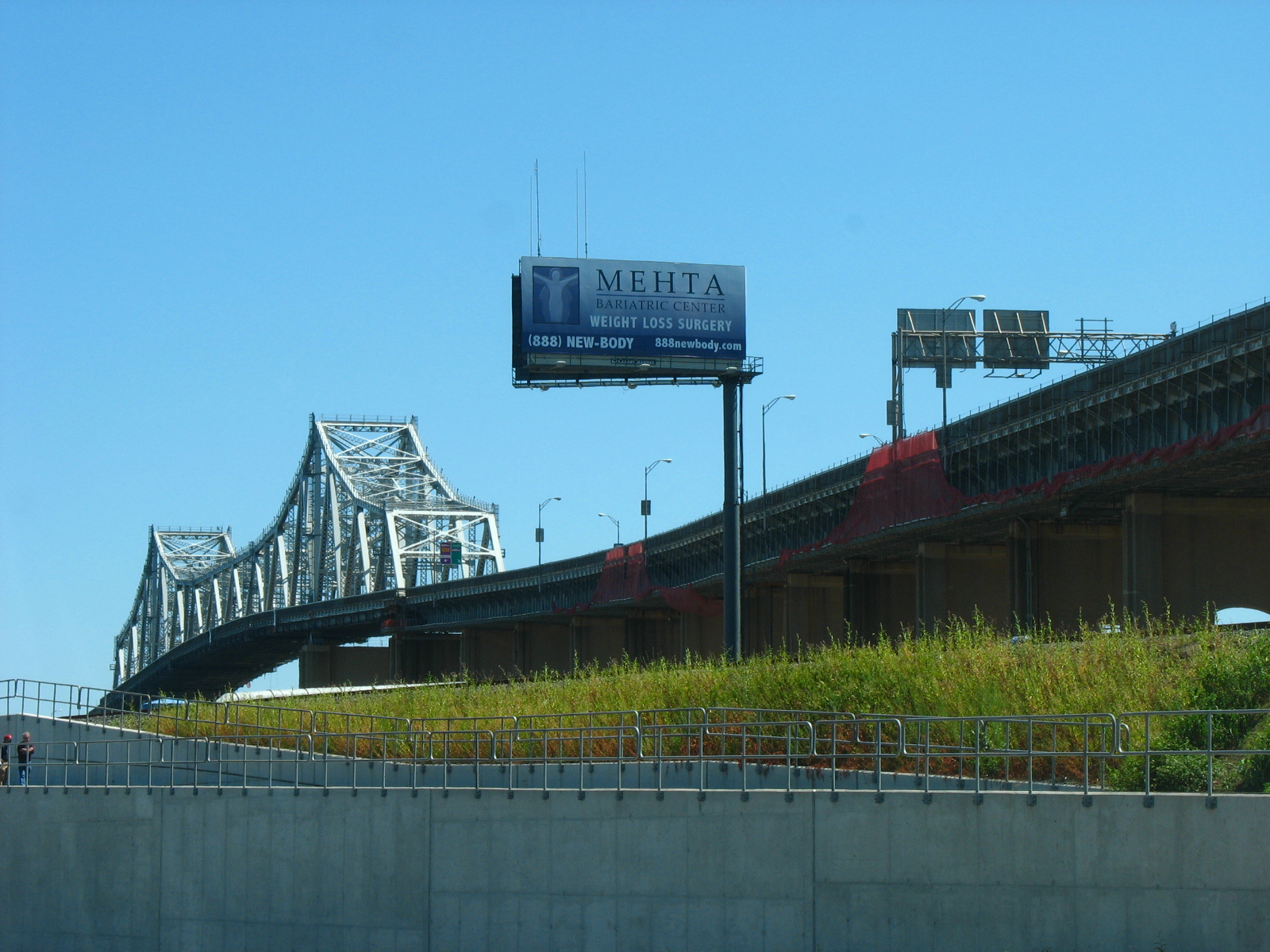
Goethals Bridge

Midtown, also occasionally known as Uptown, is the main commercial district and a historic section as well. It includes the First Presbyterian Church and St. John's Episcopal Church, and its St. John's Episcopal Churchyard. The First Presbyterian Church was a battleground for the American Revolution. Located here are also the 1931 Art Deco Hersch Tower, the Thomas Jefferson Arts Academy, and the Ritz Theatre which has been operating since 1926. Midtown/Uptown includes the area once known as "Brittanville" which contained many English type gardens.

=== Bayway ===
Bayway is located in the southern part of the city and borders the City of Linden. From U.S. Route 1&9 and Allen Street, between the Elizabeth River and the Arthur Kill, it has maintained a strong Polish community for years. Developed at the turn of the 20th century, many of the area residents once worked at the refinery which straddles both Elizabeth and Linden. There are unique ethnic restaurants, bars and stores along Bayway, and a variety of houses of worship. Housing styles are older and well maintained. There are many affordable two to four-family housing units and multiple apartment complexes. The western terminus of the Goethals Bridge, which spans the Arthur Kill to Staten Island can be found here. A small section of the neighborhood was isolated with both the completion of the Goethals Bridge in 1928 and the construction of the New Jersey Turnpike in the 1950s.

=== Downtown / Elizabethport ===
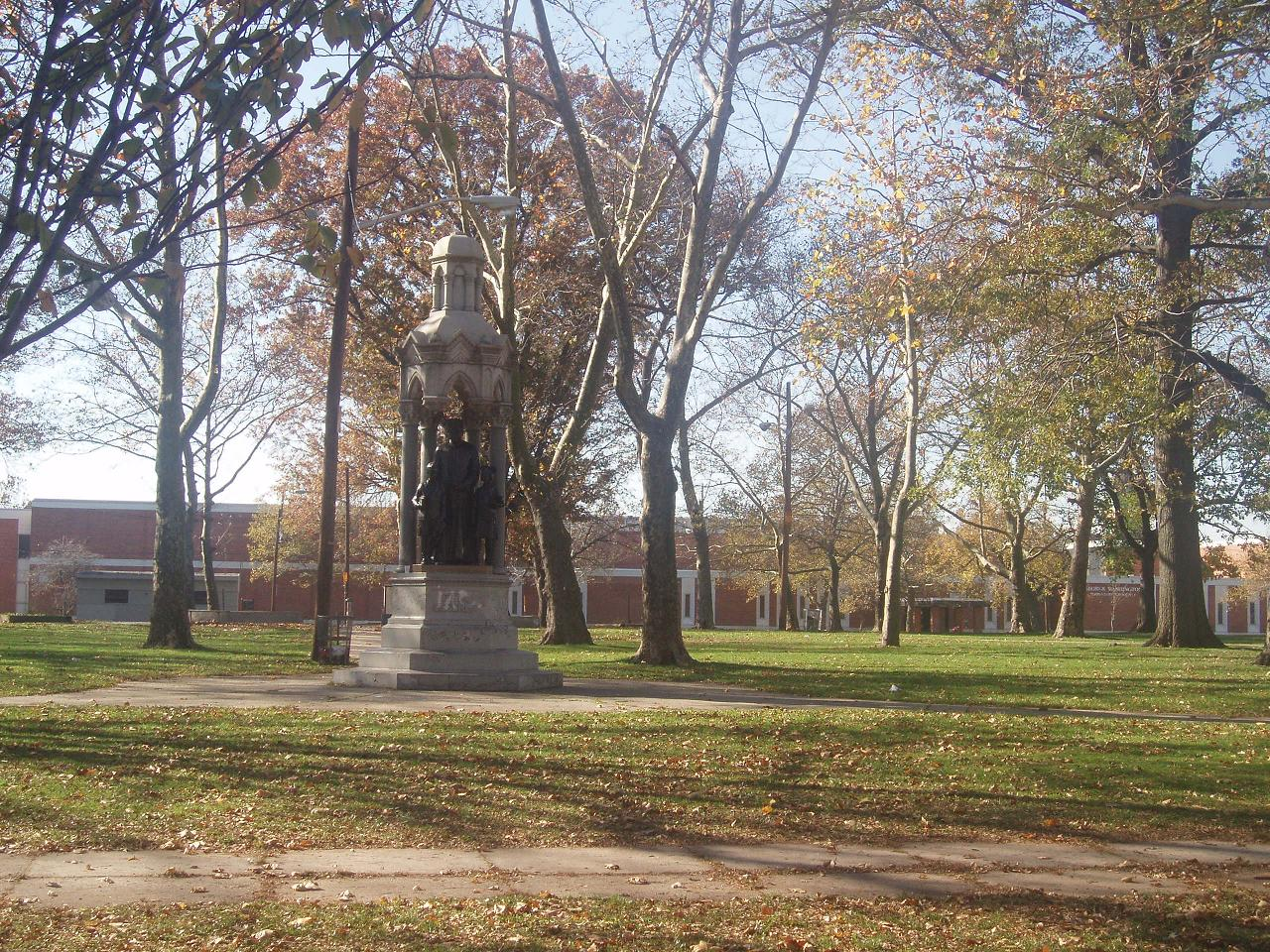
School # 1 seen in the distance from the park on Court Street

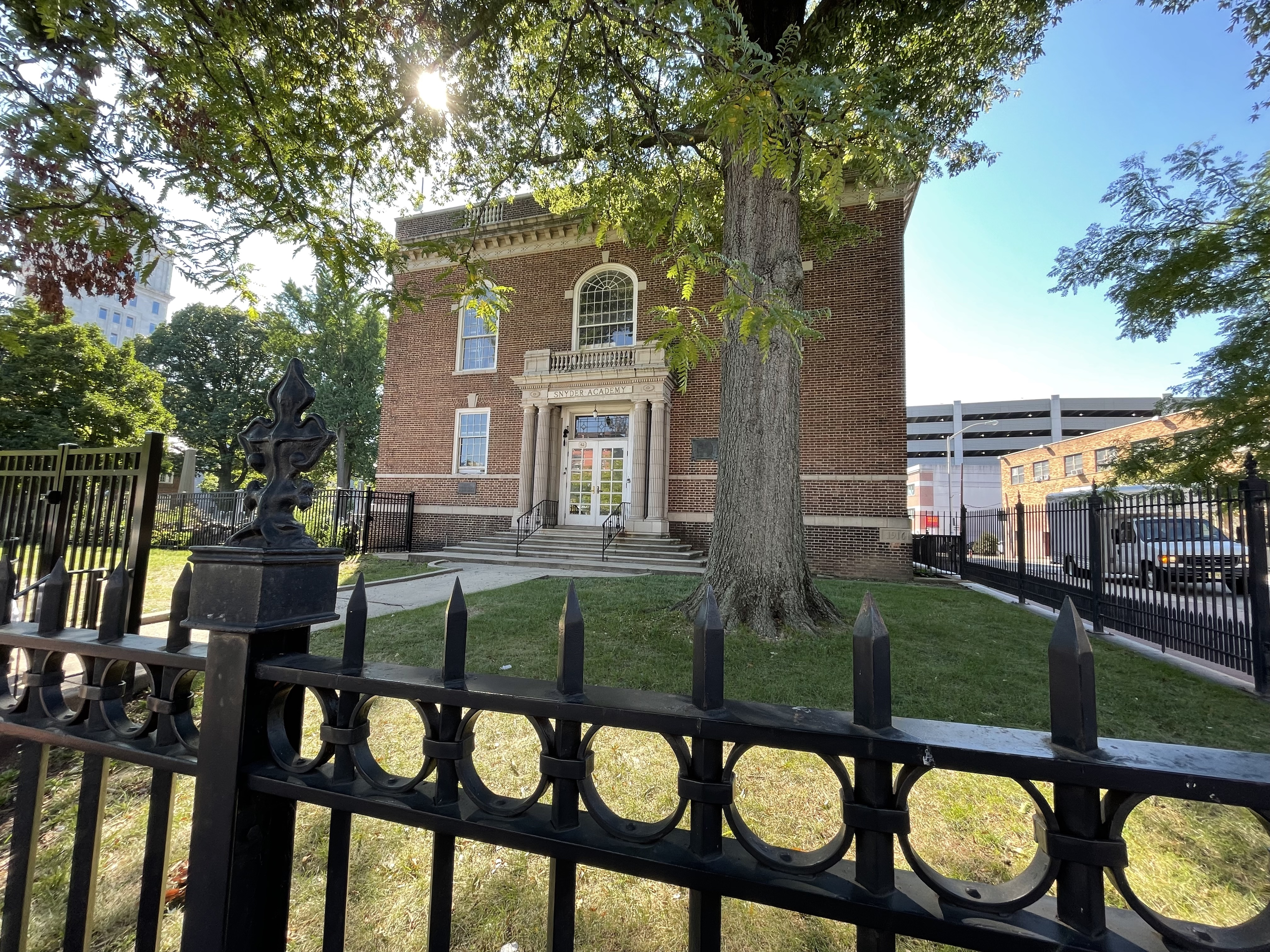
Snyder Academy

Downtown / E-Port (a.k.a. The Port and Elizabethport) is the oldest neighborhood in Elizabeth. It consists of a collection of old world Elizabethan, new American colonial-style houses and apartment buildings that stretch east of 7th Street to its shores. The name is derived from its dependence on businesses catering to seagoing ventures. It was a thriving center of commerce between the 1660s through the middle of the 20th century. This area has had a great deal of improvement since 2000. Many homes have been renovated or been replaced with new, more ornate structures. Federal housing projects that stood for decades along First Street have been demolished and replaced with low to moderate income housing. The waterfront is home to new town homes and two-family homes (duplexes).

The area was once three distinct neighborhoods: Buckeye, Diamondville, and New Mexico. It was the US home of the Singer Manufacturing Company, makers of Singer sewing machines, which constructed a 1,400,000-square-foot (130,000 m^{2}) facility on a 32-acre (13 ha) site in 1873. Shortly after it opened, the factory manufactured the majority of all sewing machines worldwide. With 6,000 employees working there in the 1870s, it employed the largest number of workers at a single facility in 1873. The company moved out of Elizabeth in 1982.

Elizabeth Marina, which was once filled with trash and debris along its walkway, was also restored. It is the site of year-round celebrations from a Hispanic festival in late spring to the lighting of a Christmas tree in winter. Living conditions in this area continue to improve year after year. Historically, there were immigrant communities centered around Christian churches. The Slavic community was centered by Sts. Peter and Paul Byzantine, the Lithuanian community attended Sts. Peter and Paul Roman Catholic and the Polish community attended St. Adalbert Roman Catholic Church which still stands. St. Patrick Church, originally Irish, dominates the 'Port; the cornerstone for the second and current building was laid in 1887.

=== Elmora and The West End ===
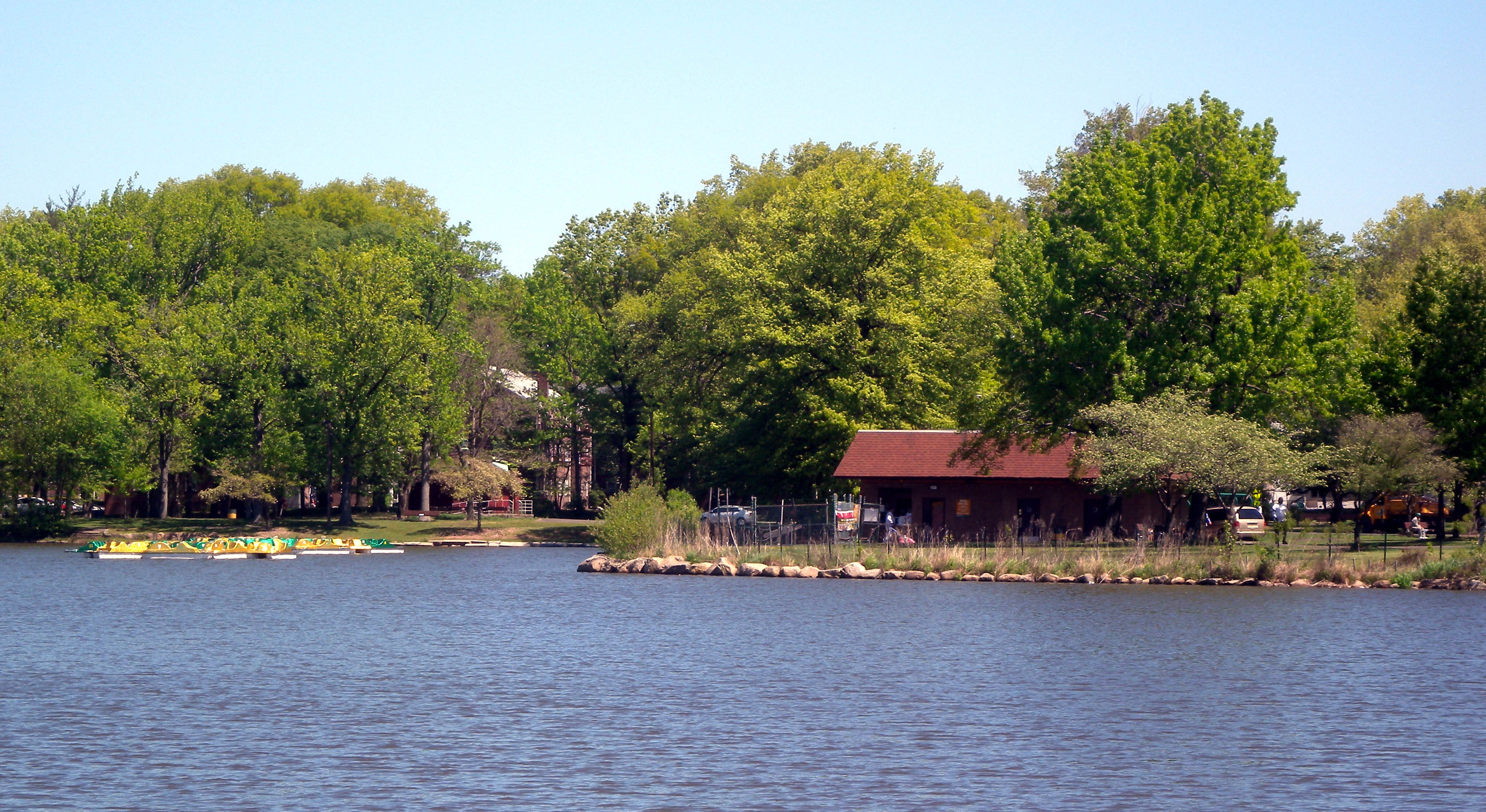
Warinanco Park in Elmora

Elmora is a middle/working-class neighborhood in the western part of Elizabeth. The main thoroughfare, Elmora Avenue, offers restaurants, shops and boutiques. Several high-rise building complexes, affording views of the New York City skyline, dot the edge of this neighborhood and are accessible to the Elizabeth station. The neighborhood area forms a "V" from its approximate borders of the Central Railroad tracks to Rahway Avenue.

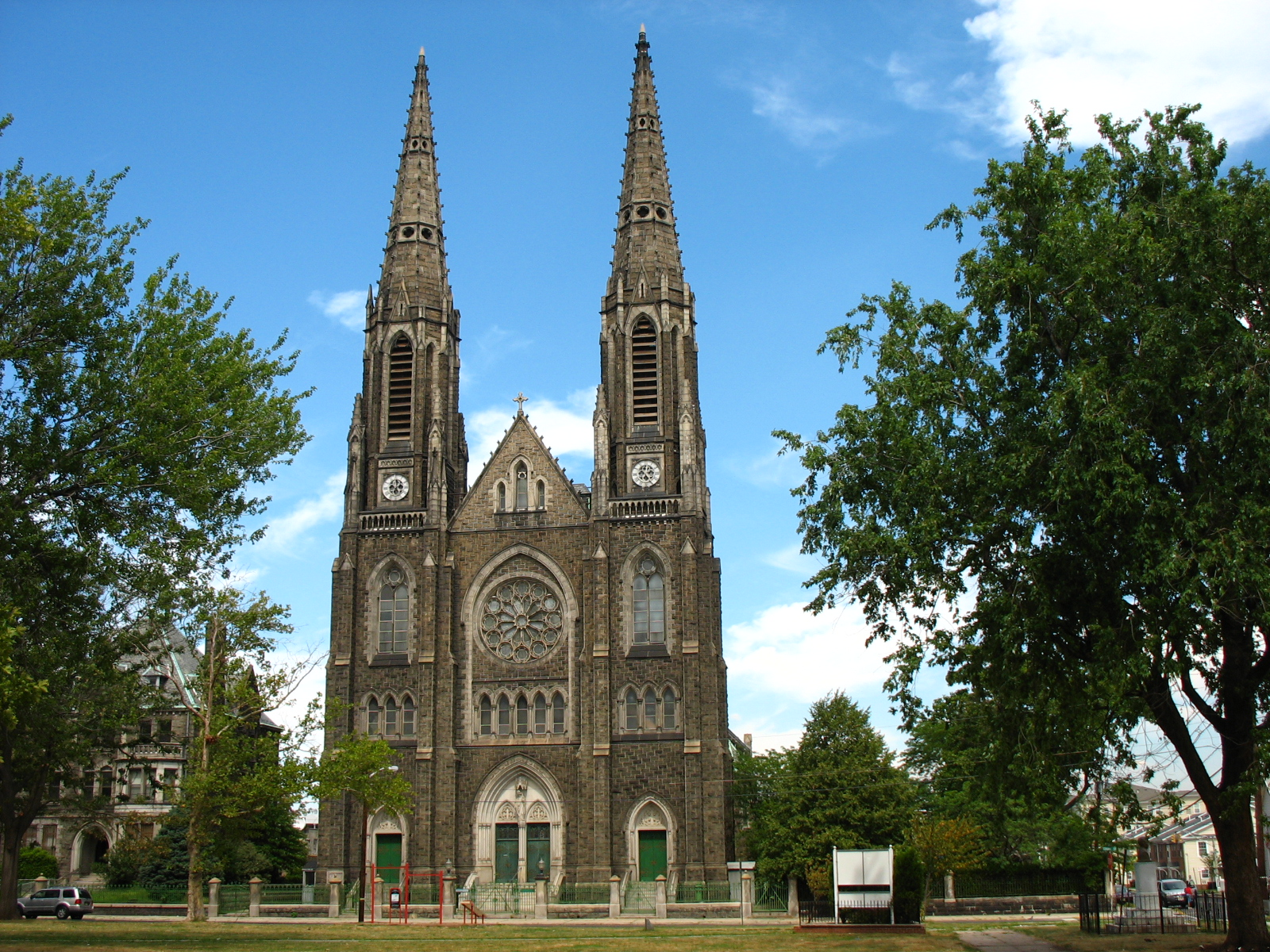
St. Patrick's Church, Elizabethport

==== Elmora's modern Orthodox community ====
The Elmora section of Elizabeth is home to a large Modern Orthodox community. The Jewish Educational Center of Elizabeth was founded in 1941 by a Latvian-born rabbi, Pinchas Mordechai Teitz, who arrived to lecture in to the city's then-small Orthodox community in the 1930s.

=== Elmora Hills ===
The northwestern part of Elmora is known as Elmora Hills. It is a strongly middle- to upper-middle-class neighborhood. Originally called Shearerville, the name Elmora came from the developers of the area, the El Mora Land Company. This area was annexed from Union Township, returning to Elizabeth in the early part of the 20th century. This was done to increase the city's tax base as major improvements to infrastructure were necessary at the time.

=== Frog Hollow ===
Frog Hollow is a small community of homes east of Atlantic Street, west of the Arthur Kill and south of Elizabeth Avenue. Its name is derived from the frogs that could be caught in its marshes as well as the oyster and fishing of the past. The area expanded east and includes the area formerly known as Helltown. Helltown included many of the docks and shipyards, as well as several drydocks. The area's developer was Edward N. Kellogg, who also laid out the neighborhood in Keighry Head. Frog Hollow contains older-style, more affordable homes, rentals, and some quality restaurants in a working-class community. The statue honoring former Mayor Mack on Elizabeth Avenue is a landmark in the community. Frog Hollow is also convenient to the Veteran's Memorial Waterfront Park.

=== Keighry Head ===
Its name is attributed to James Keighry of the Isle of Kerry, Ireland. He owned a business facing the square formed at the junction of Jackson, Madison, Chestnut and Magnolia Avenues. The approximate borders of this neighborhood extended north from East Grand Street to Flora Street and from Walnut to Division Street. Developed by Edward N. Kellogg, many of the streets were named after family and friends. Keighry Head is located close to Midtown, containing affordable one and two-family homes, and apartment houses, convenient to the Midtown shopping district and transportation.

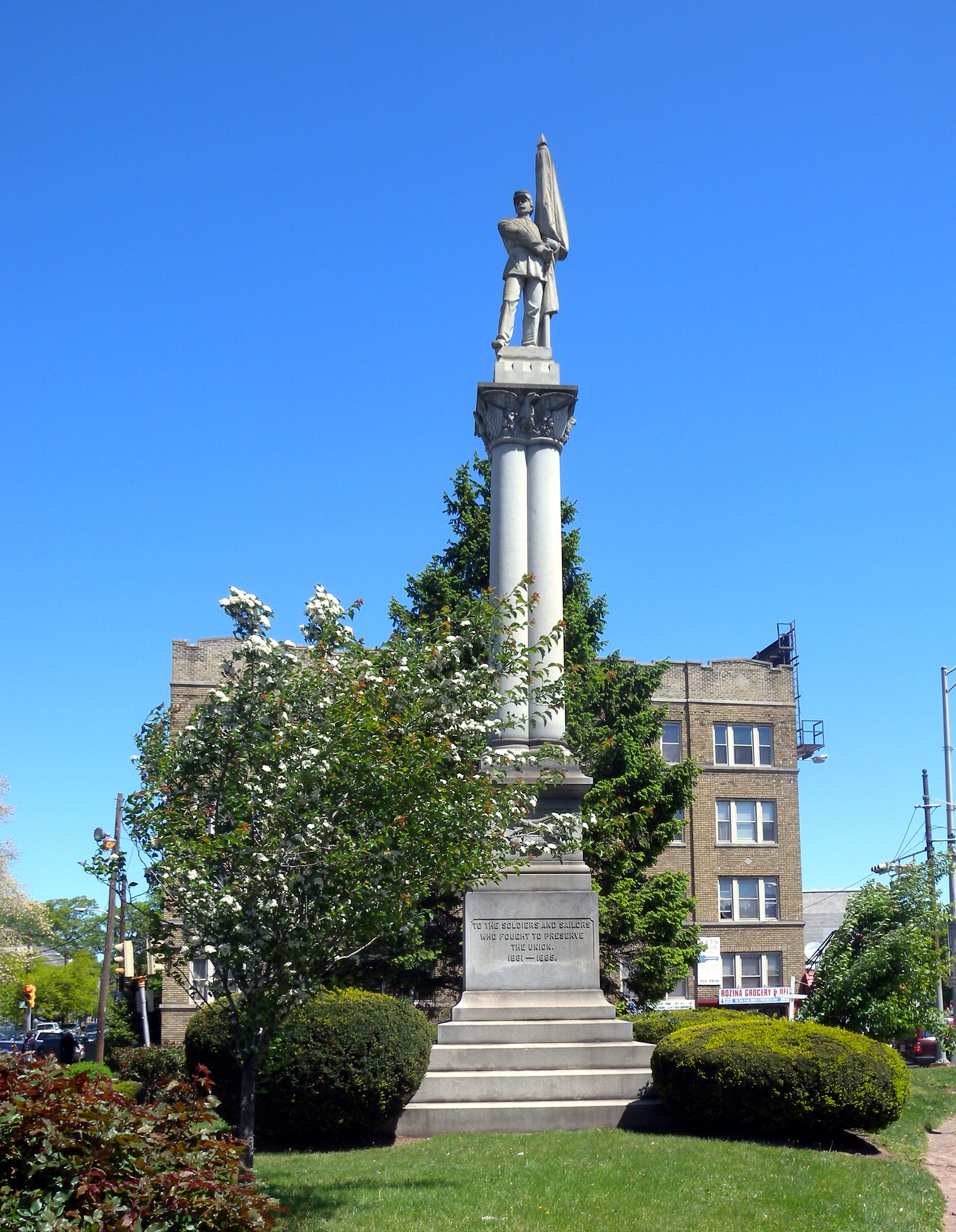
War monument; north Elizabeth

=== North End / North Elizabeth ===
The North End, also known as "North Elizabeth", is a diverse working-class neighborhood. The borders are approximately the Arch north to the city line between North Broad Street and U.S. Route 1&9. It was developed mostly in the 1920s for workers in the Duesenberg automobile plant (later Durant Auto, Burry Biscuits and Interbake Foods). The area was heavily settled by the Irish and then Portuguese. The North End has easy access to New York City and Newark via its own NJ Transit train station, Routes 1 and 9 and the New Jersey Turnpike. The neighborhood also has Crane Square, the Historic Nugents Tavern, and Kellogg Park, and is near Newark Liberty International Airport. There is a current plan to develop the former Interbake Foods facility into shopping and residential townhouses and condominiums. This community contains many larger one and two-family homes that have been rebuilt over the past decade. North Elizabeth also features many well-kept apartment houses and condominium units on and around North Avenue that are home to professionals who work in New York or the area. The only Benedictine women's community in New Jersey is located at Saint Walburga Monastery on North Broad Street.

=== Peterstown ===
Peterstown (also known as "The Burg") is a middle/working-class neighborhood in the southeastern part of the city. Its borders run west of Atlantic Street to South Spring Street from 1st Avenue to the Elizabeth River. Its name is derived from John Peters, who owned most of the land with George Peters. They divided the land and developed it during the end of the 19th century. The area was once predominantly occupied by its earliest settlers, who were German, and during the 1920s was gentrified by newly immigrated Italians. Peterstown has clean, quiet streets and has many affordable housing opportunities with a "village" feel. The area contains the historic Union Square, which is home to produce stands, meat markets, fresh fish and poultry stores. Peterstown is also home of the DeCavalcante crime family, one of the most infamous Mafia families in the United States.

=== The Point / the Crossroads ===
The Point, formally known as the Crossroads, is centrally located and defined by New Point Road and Division Street. It is close to Midtown and contains many new affordable two-family homes, apartment houses and is undergoing a transformation. The former Elizabeth General Hospital site is currently being demolished and awaiting a new development.

=== Quality Hill ===
Home to St. Mary's and the "Hilltoppers", this area once was lined with mansions. Its approximate borders were South Broad Street to Grier Avenue and Pearl Street to what is now U.S. Route 1&9. During its development in the 1860s it was the most fashionable area of the city to live. It is now a quiet middle class community experiencing a re-development with many new condominiums.

=== Westminster ===
Developed by Edward J. Grassman, Westminster got its name from the city's largest residential estates of the Tudor style and was inhabited by many residents who traced their ancestry to England. This neighborhood borders Hillside with the Elizabeth River running its border creating a dramatic splash of greenery and rolling hills off of North Avenue, near Liberty Hall. Residents use this area for recreation, whether it is at the newly christened Phil Rizzuto Park area, or for bird watching or for sunbathing by the river. It is one of the more affluent areas of Elizabeth.

=== Climate ===
The climate in this area is characterized by hot, humid summers and cool to cold winters. According to the Köppen Climate Classification system, Elizabeth straddles the boundary between a humid subtropical climate and a hot-summer humid continental climate.

== Demographics ==
Historical population
Census	Pop.	Note	%±
1810	2,977		—
1820	3,515		18.1%
1830	3,455		−1.7%
1840	4,184		21.1%
1850	5,583		33.4%
1860	11,567		107.2%
1870	20,832	*	80.1%
1880	28,229		35.5%
1890	37,764		33.8%
1900	52,130		38.0%
1910	73,409		40.8%
1920	95,783		30.5%
1930	114,589		19.6%
1940	109,912		−4.1%
1950	112,817		2.6%
1960	107,698		−4.5%
1970	112,654		4.6%
1980	106,201		−5.7%
1990	110,002		3.6%
2000	120,568		9.6%
2010	124,969		3.7%
2020	137,298		9.9%
2025 (est.)	141,675		3.2%
Population sources: 1810–1970; 1810–1920 1810 1820; 1830 1840 1850–1870; 1850 1870 1880–1890; 1890–1910 1860–1930; 1940–2000 2000; 2010 2020 * = Lost territory in previous decade.

=== 2020 census ===
Elizabeth, New Jersey – Racial and ethnic composition Note: the US Census treats Hispanic/Latino as an ethnic category. This table excludes Latinos from the racial categories and assigns them to a separate category. Hispanics/Latinos may be of any race.
Race / Ethnicity (NH = Non-Hispanic)	Pop 1990	Pop 2000	Pop 2010	Pop 2020	% 1990	% 2000	% 2010	% 2020
White alone (NH)	43,720	32,338	22,705	16,553	39.74%	26.82%	18.17%	12.06%
Black or African American alone (NH)	19,981	22,329	23,072	22,261	18.16%	18.52%	18.46%	16.21%
Native American or Alaska Native alone (NH)	167	145	138	152	0.15%	0.12%	0.11%	0.11%
Asian alone (NH)	2,752	2,745	2,521	2,757	2.50%	2.28%	2.02%	2.01%
Native Hawaiian or Pacific Islander alone (NH)	N/A	18	31	18	N/A	0.01%	0.02%	0.01%
Other race alone (NH)	332	496	811	2,145	0.30%	0.41%	0.65%	1.56%
Mixed race or Multiracial (NH)	N/A	2,870	1,338	3,179	N/A	2.38%	1.07%	2.32%
Hispanic or Latino (any race)	43,050	59,627	74,353	90,233	39.14%	49.46%	59.50%	65.72%
Total	110,002	120,568	124,969	137,298	100.00%	100.00%	100.00%	100.00%

In 2019, the foreign-born population in the city was 46.6% of the total population and the Latino population was 65%. The most reported ancestries in 2020 were:

- Dominican (9.5%)
- Colombian (9.5%)
- Puerto Rican (8.3%)
- African American (8.2%)
- Salvadoran (7.1%)
- Ecuadorian (6.1%)
- Cuban (4.2%)
- Peruvian (4.1%)
- Portuguese (3.8%)
- Mexican (3.4%)

=== 2010 census ===
The 2010 United States census counted 124,969 people, 41,596 households, and 29,325 families in the city. The population density was 10,144.1 per square mile (3,916.7/km^{2}). There were 45,516 housing units at an average density of 3,694.7 per square mile (1,426.5/km^{2}). The racial makeup was 54.65% (68,292) White, 21.08% (26,343) Black or African American, 0.83% (1,036) Native American, 2.08% (2,604) Asian, 0.04% (52) Pacific Islander, 16.72% (20,901) from other races, and 4.59% (5,741) from two or more races. Hispanic or Latino residents of any race were 59.50% (74,353) of the population. Elizabeth had the tenth-highest percentage of Hispanic residents among municipalities in New Jersey in 2010.

Of the 41,596 households, 37.0% had children under the age of 18; 39.2% were married couples living together; 22.0% had a female householder with no husband present and 29.5% were non-families. Of all households, 23.5% were made up of individuals and 7.2% had someone living alone who was 65 years of age or older. The average household size was 2.94 and the average family size was 3.43.

25.6% of the population were under the age of 18, 10.6% from 18 to 24, 31.3% from 25 to 44, 23.3% from 45 to 64, and 9.2% who were 65 years of age or older. The median age was 33.2 years. For every 100 females, the population had 98.6 males. For every 100 females ages 18 and older there were 96.8 males.

The Census Bureau's 2006–2010 American Community Survey showed that (in 2010 inflation-adjusted dollars) median household income was $43,770 (with a margin of error of +/− $1,488) and the median family income was $46,891 (+/− $1,873). Males had a median income of $32,268 (+/− $1,205) versus $27,228 (+/− $1,427) for females. The per capita income for the borough was $19,196 (+/− $604). About 14.7% of families and 16.7% of the population were below the poverty line, including 23.5% of those under age 18 and 18.5% of those age 65 or over.

=== 2000 census ===
As of the 2000 United States census there were 120,568 people, 40,482 households, and 28,175 families residing in the city. The population density was 9,865.5 inhabitants per square mile (3,809.1/km^{2}). There were 42,838 housing units at an average density of 3,505.2 per square mile (1,353.4/km^{2}). The racial makeup of the city was 55.78% White, 19.98% Black or African American, 0.48% Native American, 2.35% Asian, 0.05% Pacific Islander, 15.51% from other races, and 5.86% from two or more races. Hispanic or Latino of any race were 49.46% of the population.

Colombia is the nation of birth for the highest number of foreign-born inhabitants of Elizabeth; it was the birthplace of 8,731 Elizabeth residents as of the 2000 Census. This exceeded the combined total of 8,214 for Mexican and Central American immigrants. It also far exceeded the next highest single nation count of Cuba at 5,812. The highest number for a non-Spanish speaking country and third highest overall was Portugal, whose native-born immigrants numbered 4,544. The next largest groups were Salvadoran immigrants numbering 4,043, Peruvians at 3,591 and Dominican immigrants, of whom there were 3,492.

There were 40,482 households, out of which 36.6% had children under the age of 18 living with them, 42.9% were married couples living together, 19.1% had a female householder with no husband present, and 30.4% were non-families. 24.6% of all households were made up of individuals, and 8.4% had someone living alone who was 65 years of age or older. The average household size was 2.91 and the average family size was 3.45.

In the city the population was spread out, with 26.3% under the age of 18, 10.8% from 18 to 24, 33.7% from 25 to 44, 19.3% from 45 to 64, and 10.0% who were 65 years of age or older. The median age was 33 years. For every 100 females, there were 98.0 males. For every 100 females age 18 and over, there were 96.1 males.

The median income for a household in the city was $35,175, and the median income for a family was $38,370. Males had a median income of $30,757 versus $23,931 for females. The per capita income for the city was $15,114. About 15.6% of families and 17.8% of the population were below the poverty line, including 22.2% of those under age 18 and 17.2% of those age 65 or over.

== Economy ==
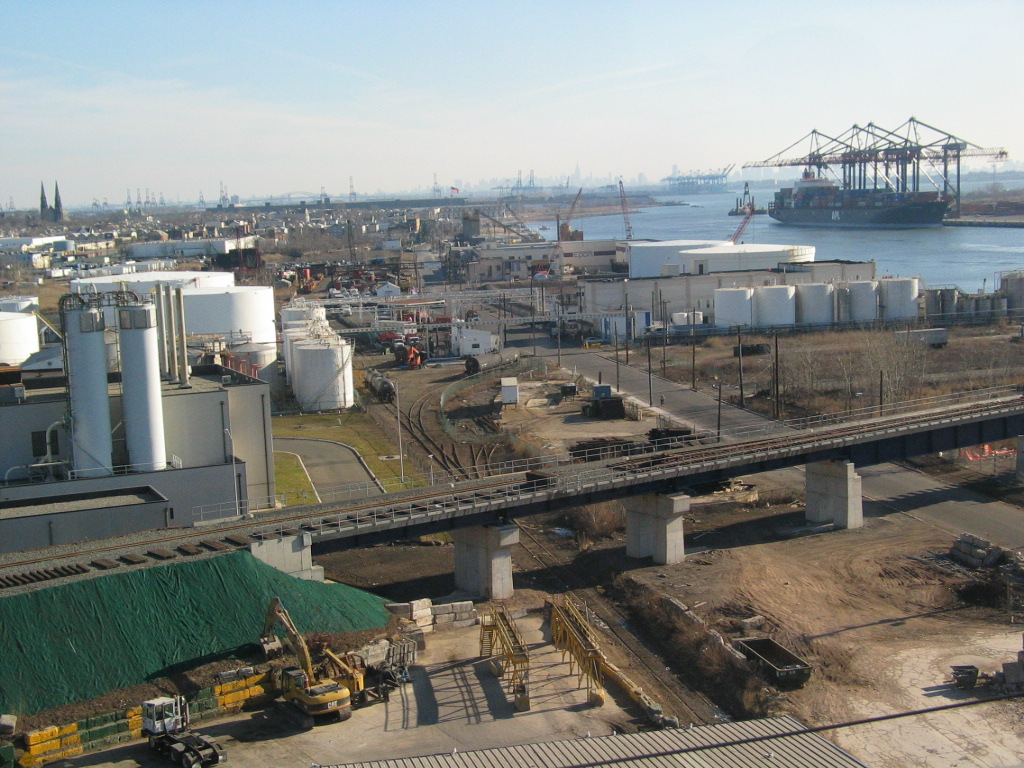
The industrial region in eastern Elizabeth

Since World War II, Elizabeth has seen its transportation facilities grow; the Port Newark-Elizabeth Marine Terminal is one of the busiest ports in the world, as is Newark Liberty International Airport, located in both Newark and Elizabeth. Elizabeth also features Little Jimmy's Italian Ices (since 1932), The Mills At Jersey Gardens outlet mall, Loews Theater and the Elizabeth Center, which generate millions of dollars in revenue. Companies based in Elizabeth included New England Motor Freight.

The Bayway Refinery, a Phillips 66 refining facility that supplies petroleum-based products to the New York/New Jersey area, is located in neighboring Linden, along the Elizabeth border, producing approximately 230,000 barrels (37,000 m^{3}) per day.

Celadon, a mixed-use development containing 14 glass skyscrapers, offices, retail, a hotel, boardwalk and many other amenities is proposed to border the east side of The Mills at Jersey Gardens, directly on the Port Newark Bay. Groundbreaking was scheduled for the summer of 2008 on the ferry, roads and parking, and construction was planned to continue for at least twelve years. As of 2021 this project has not started construction and there is no recent news about Celadon, so it is assumed that this project has been canceled

Portions of the city are part of an Urban Enterprise Zone (UEZ), one of 32 zones covering 37 municipalities statewide. Elizabeth was selected in 1983 as one of the initial group of 10 zones chosen to participate in the program. In addition to other benefits to encourage employment and investment within the Zone, shoppers can take advantage of a reduced 3.3125% sales tax rate (half of the 6 5/8% rate charged statewide) at eligible merchants. Established in November 1992, the city's Urban Enterprise Zone status expires in November 2023.

== Sports ==
In 2025, Elizabeth became home to the Tri-State Admirals of The Basketball League, who play their home games at Thomas A. Edison Career and Technical Academy.

In 1970, the city was home to the Jersey Tigers of the Atlantic Coast Football League.

== Government ==
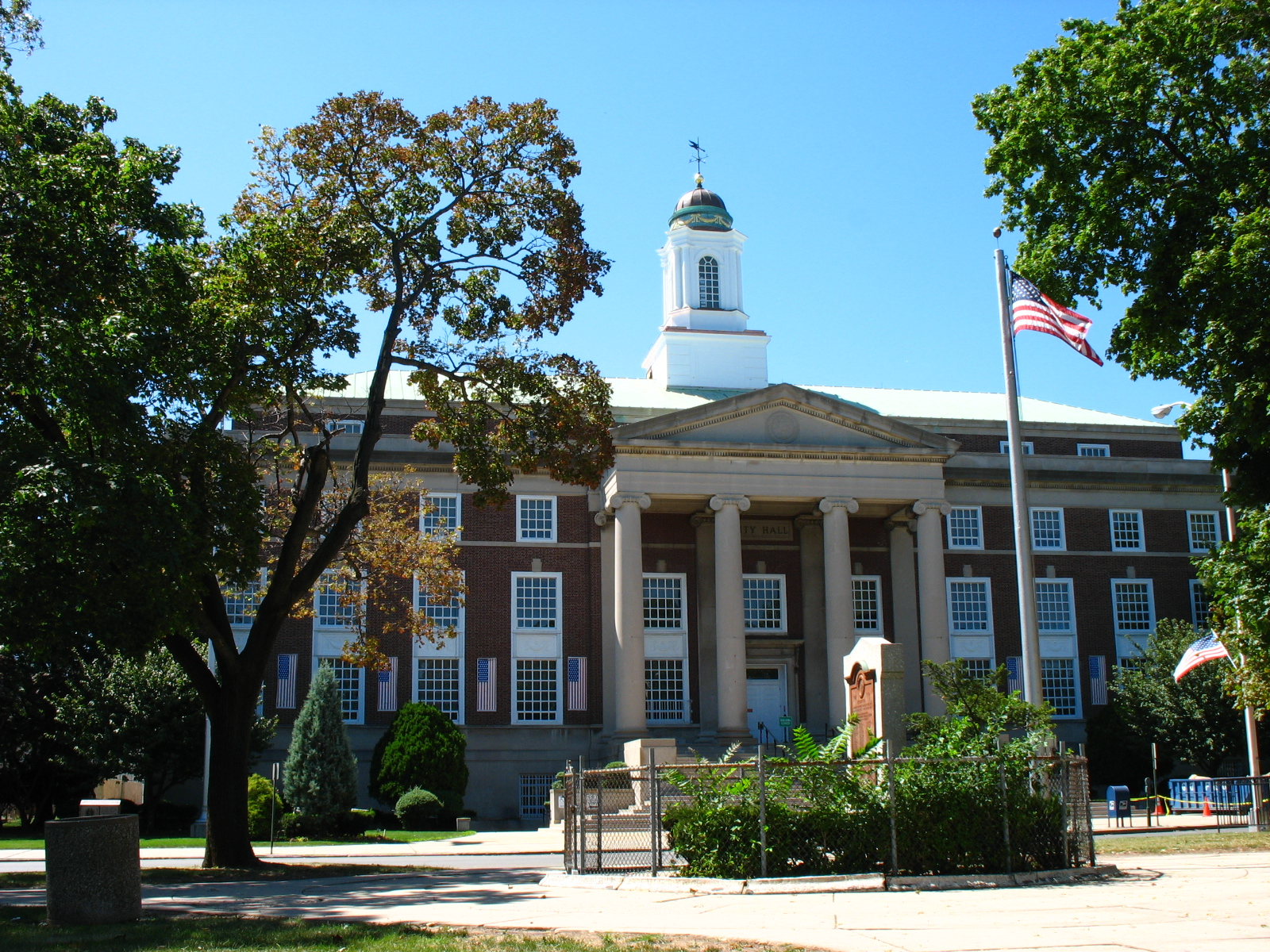
City Hall, Eggers & Higgins, architects, 1940.

=== Local government ===
The City of Elizabeth is governed within the Faulkner Act, formally known as the Optional Municipal Charter Law, under the Mayor-Council system of municipal government. The city is one of 71 municipalities (of the 564) statewide that use this form of government. The governing body is comprised of the Mayor and the City Council. The Elizabeth City Council includes nine members, who are elected to serve four-year terms of office on a staggered basis with elections held in even-numbered years. The mayor and the three council members elected at-large come up for election together in leap years and two years later the six members who are elected from each of Elizabeth's six wards are all up for election.

As of 2026, the city's Mayor is Democrat Chris Bollwage, a lifelong resident of Elizabeth who is serving his ninth term as Mayor, serving a term of office that ends December 31, 2028. City Council members are Council President Manny Grova Jr. (at-large; D, 2028), Carlos Cedeño (Fourth Ward; D, 2026), Frank J. Cuesta (at-large; D, 2028), William Gallman Jr. (Fifth Ward; D, 2026), Nelson Gonzalez (Second Ward; D, 2026), Kevin Kiniery (Third Ward; D, 2026), Frank O. Mazza (Sixth Ward; D, 2026), Patricia Perkins-Auguste (at-large; D, 2028), and Carlos L. Torres (First Ward; D, 2026).

Bollwage, who has served as mayor of Elizabeth since 1992, was paid an annual salary of $152,564 in 2016, placing him among the three highest-paid mayors in the state and the only mayor in Union County to earn annual compensation in excess of $100,000.

=== Federal, state and county representation ===
Elizabeth is located in the 8th Congressional District and is part of New Jersey's 20th state legislative district. Prior to the 2010 Census, Elizabeth had been split between the 10th Congressional District and the 13th Congressional District, a change made by the New Jersey Redistricting Commission that took effect in January 2013, based on the results of the November 2012 general elections.

For the 119th United States Congress, New Jersey's 8th congressional district is represented by Rob Menendez (D, Jersey City). New Jersey is represented in the United States Senate by Democrats Cory Booker (Newark, term ends 2027) and Andy Kim (Moorestown, term ends 2031).

For the 2026–2027 session, the 20th legislative district of the New Jersey Legislature is represented in the State Senate by Joseph Cryan (D, Union Township) and in the General Assembly by Annette Quijano (D, Elizabeth) and Ed Rodriguez (D, Elizabeth).

Union County is governed by a Board of County Commissioners, whose nine members are elected at-large to three-year terms of office on a staggered basis with three seats coming up for election each year, with an appointed County Manager overseeing the day-to-day operations of the county. At an annual reorganization meeting held in the beginning of January, the board selects a Chair and Vice Chair from among its members. As of 2026, Union County's County Commissioners are:

Vice Chair Rebecca Williams (D, Plainfield, 2028), Chairman Joesph Bodek (D, Linden, 2026), James E. Baker Jr. (D, Rahway, 2027), Michele Delisfort (D, Union Township, 2026), Lourdes M. Leon (D, Elizabeth, 2026), Alexander Mirabella (D, Fanwood, 2027) Kimberly Palmieri-Mouded (D, Westfield, 2027). Stanley J. Neron (D, Elizabeth, 2028), Joseph Signorello III (D, Roselle Park, 2028)

Constitutional officers elected on a countywide basis are: Clerk Vacant - Incumbent Clerk Joanne Rajoppi (D, Union Township) died on July 16, 2026. Her death triggered a special election for a full five-year term to be held concurrently with the November 2026 general election. Deputy Clerk Clara Fernández assumes the powers of the office until the vacancy is filled. Sheriff Peter Corvelli (D, Kenilworth, 2026) and Surrogate Christopher E. Hudak (D, Clark, 2027).

=== Politics ===
As of October 24, 2024, there are 68,000 registered voters in Elizabeth. 32,870 (48.34%) are registered Democrats, 26,212 (38.55%) are registered as Unaffiliated, 7,810 (11.49%) are registered Republicans, and 1,108 (1.6%) are registered to other parties.

Gubernatorial election results for Elizabeth
Year	Republican		Democratic		Third party(ies)	
Year	No.	%	No.	%	No.	%
2025	5,057	24.89%	15,023	73.95%	235	1.16%
2021	3,568	28.21%	8,957	70.82%	122	0.96%
2017	2,140	16.50%	10,589	81.64%	241	1.86%
2013	4,379	35.47%	7,804	63.21%	163	1.32%
2009	4,386	28.95%	10,258	67.71%	507	3.35%
2005	3,300	22.02%	11,314	75.51%	370	2.47%

In the 2012 presidential election, Democrat Barack Obama received 24,751 votes (80.8% vs. 66.0% countywide), ahead of Republican Mitt Romney with 5,213 votes (17.0% vs. 32.3%) and other candidates with 166 votes (0.5% vs. 0.8%), among the 30,640 ballots cast by the city's 50,715 registered voters, for a turnout of 60.4% (vs. 68.8% in Union County). In the 2008 presidential election, Democrat Barack Obama received 23,524 votes (74.3% vs. 63.1% countywide), ahead of Republican John McCain with 7,559 votes (23.9% vs. 35.2%) and other candidates with 202 votes (0.6% vs. 0.9%), among the 31,677 ballots cast by the city's 48,294 registered voters, for a turnout of 65.6% (vs. 74.7% in Union County). In the 2004 presidential election, Democrat John Kerry received 18,363 votes (67.2% vs. 58.3% countywide), ahead of Republican George W. Bush with 8,486 votes (31.0% vs. 40.3%) and other candidates with 144 votes (0.5% vs. 0.7%), among the 27,334 ballots cast by the city's 45,882 registered voters, for a turnout of 59.6% (vs. 72.3% in the whole county).

United States presidential election results for Elizabeth
Year	Republican		Democratic		Third party(ies)	
Year	No.	%	No.	%	No.	%
2024	13,238	42.82%	17,149	55.48%	526	1.70%
2020	10,002	28.92%	24,326	70.34%	256	0.74%
2016	6,057	18.77%	25,493	78.98%	727	2.25%
2012	5,213	17.30%	24,751	82.15%	166	0.55%
2008	7,559	24.16%	23,524	75.19%	202	0.65%
2004	8,486	31.44%	18,363	68.03%	144	0.53%

In the 2017 gubernatorial election, Democrat Phil Murphy received 10,589 votes (81.6% vs. 65.2% countywide), ahead of Republican Kim Guadagno with 2,140 votes (16.5% vs. 32.6%), and other candidates with 241 votes (1.9% vs. 2.1%), among the 13,607 ballots cast by the township's 55,569 registered voters, for a turnout of 24.5%. In the 2013 gubernatorial election, Democrat Barbara Buono received 63.2% of the vote (7,804 cast), ahead of Republican Chris Christie with 35.5% (4,379 votes), and other candidates with 1.3% (163 votes), among the 13,592 ballots cast by the city's 49,515 registered voters (1,246 ballots were spoiled), for a turnout of 27.5%. In the 2009 gubernatorial election, Democrat Jon Corzine received 10,258 ballots cast (66.8% vs. 50.6% countywide), ahead of Republican Chris Christie with 4,386 votes (28.6% vs. 41.7%), Independent Chris Daggett with 376 votes (2.4% vs. 5.9%) and other candidates with 131 votes (0.9% vs. 0.8%), among the 15,355 ballots cast by the city's 46,219 registered voters, yielding a 33.2% turnout (vs. 46.5% in the county).

United States Senate election results for Elizabeth1
Year	Republican		Democratic		Third party(ies)	
Year	No.	%	No.	%	No.	%
2024	9,509	36.88%	15,390	59.68%	887	3.44%
2018	3,688	18.63%	15,025	75.90%	1,083	5.47%
2012	3,549	13.75%	21,934	85.00%	322	1.25%
2006	3,665	23.90%	11,456	74.70%	216	1.41%

United States Senate election results for Elizabeth2
Year	Republican		Democratic		Third party(ies)	
Year	No.	%	No.	%	No.	%
2020	7,502	22.91%	24,552	74.99%	688	2.10%
2014	1,971	16.18%	10,017	82.23%	193	1.58%
2013	1,487	20.24%	5,766	78.49%	93	1.27%
2008	5,173	21.71%	18,288	76.74%	369	1.55%

== Police department ==
The Elizabeth Police Department was established in May 1858.

The current Police Director is Earl Graves and the Chief of Police is Giacomo Sacca.

The Table of Organization authorizes 365 officers, including 9 captains, 21 lieutenants and 39 sergeants.

== Fire department ==
Elizabeth Fire Department (EFD)
Operational area
- Country: United States
- State: New Jersey
- City: Elizabeth

Agency overview
- Established: January 1, 1902
- Staffing: Career
- Fire chief: Sal Barraco
- EMS level: BLS

Facilities and equipment
- Divisions: 1
- Battalions: 2
- Stations: 7
- Engines: 7
- Trucks: 3
- Rescues: 1
- Ambulances: 5
- Tenders: 1
- HAZMAT: 1
- USAR: 1
- Fireboats: 1
- Light and air: 1

The Elizabeth Fire Department provides fire protection and emergency medical services to the city of Elizabeth. The Elizabeth Fire Department was established as a volunteer organization in 1837 when Engine Company # 1 was organized. In 1901, the volunteer department was no longer adequate and the department reorganized into a paid department on January 1, 1902. There are 7 Engine Companies, 3 Ladder Companies, 1 Rescue Company, and several Special Units. These companies and units are under the command of both a Deputy Chief and two Battalion Chiefs.

The department is part of the Metro USAR Strike Team, which consists of nine North Jersey fire departments and other emergency services divisions working to address major emergency rescue situations.

=== Fire station locations and apparatus ===
Engine company	Ladder company	Special unit	Command unit	Address
Engine 1		Air Cascade Unit		24 South Broad Street
Engine 2				651 South Broad Street
Engine 3	Ladder 2 (Tiller)	Haz-Mat Unit 1, Haz-Mat Decon Trailer	Battalion 1	442 Trumbull Street
Engine 5		QRV 1 (Quick Attack Response Vehicle), Foam Unit, Fire Boat 1 (docked at the port)		147 Elizabeth Avenue
Engine 6	Tower Ladder 3			472 Catherine Street
Engine 7	Ladder 1	Rescue 1, Rescue 2 – (Metro USAR Collapse Rescue Strike Team Unit), Special Operations Vehicle 1 (USAR Support)	Car 42 (Deputy Chief), Battalion 2	411 Irvington Avenue
Engine 8		Tactical Support Unit 1		524 West Grand Street

=== Emergency medical services ===
Emergency medical services are provided by the Elizabeth Fire Department's Division of Emergency Medical Services. This is a civilian division of the fire department and handles approximately 20,000 calls a year. The division is made up of an EMS chief, 5 supervisors, 28 full-time emergency medical technicians, and approximately 12 per-diem EMTs. The division, at its maximum staffing, aims to operate five ambulances and a supervisor on days (7 am–7 pm) and three ambulances and a supervisor on nights (7 pm–7 am). They also operate the NJ EMS Task Force Medical Ambulance Bus #1.

Hatzalah of Union County provides EMS primarily to the Elmora Hills neighborhood of Elizabeth, and certain sections of Hillside, Union and Roselle Park.

== Education ==
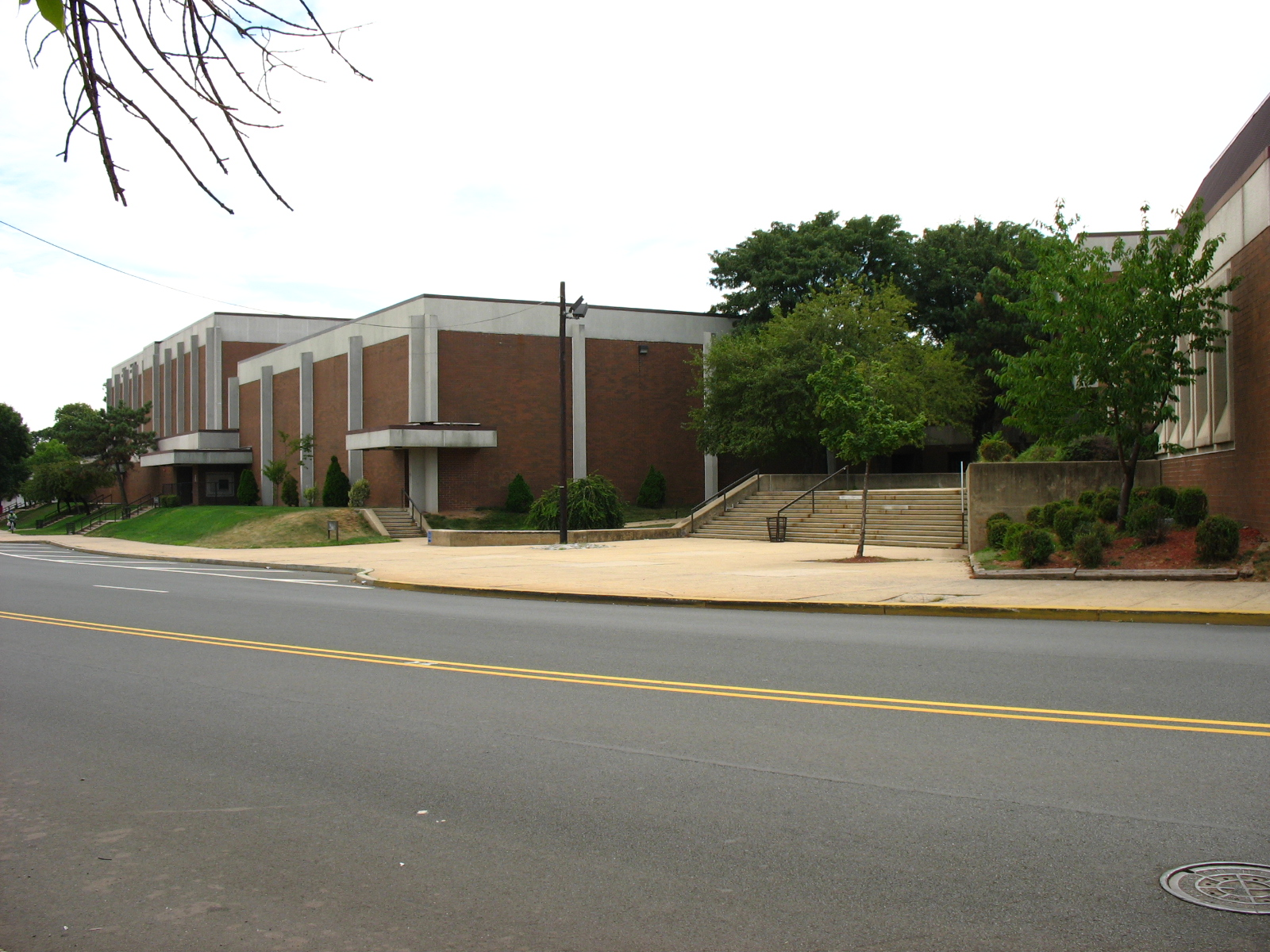
The John E. Dwyer Technology Academy and Dunn Sports Center

The city's public schools are operated by Elizabeth Public Schools, serving students in pre-kindergarten through twelfth grade. The district is one of 31 former Abbott districts statewide that were established pursuant to the decision by the New Jersey Supreme Court in Abbott v. Burke which are now referred to as "SDA Districts" based on the requirement for the state to cover all costs for school building and renovation projects in these districts under the supervision of the New Jersey Schools Development Authority. Administration and operation of the district is overseen by a nine-member board of education. The board appoints a superintendent to oversee the district's day-to-day operations and a business administrator to supervise the business functions of the district.

As of the 2018–19 school year, the district, comprised of 36 schools, had an enrollment of 28,712 students and 2,173.0 classroom teachers (on an FTE basis), for a student–teacher ratio of 13.2:1. High schools in the district (with 2018–19 enrollment data from the National Center for Education Statistics) are Elizabeth High School Frank J. Cicarell Academy (1,152; 9–12), J. Christian Bollwage Finance Academy (420; 9–12), John E. Dwyer Technology Academy (1,340; 9–12), Thomas A. Edison Career and Technical Academy (872; 9–12), Admiral William F. Halsey Jr. Health and Public Safety Academy (1,111; 9–12), Alexander Hamilton Preparatory Academy (1,014; 9–12) and Thomas Jefferson Arts Academy (1,122; 9–12).

With 5,300 students, Elizabeth High School had been the largest high school in the state of New Jersey and one of the largest in the United States, and underwent a split that created five new academies and a smaller Elizabeth High School under a transformation program that began in the 2009–2010 school year. The school was the 294th-ranked public high school in New Jersey out of 322 schools statewide, in New Jersey Monthly magazine's September 2010 cover story on the state's "Top Public High Schools", after being ranked 302nd in 2008 out of 316 schools. Before the 2008–2009 school year, all of the district's schools (except high schools) became K–8 schools, replacing the middle schools and elementary schools. SchoolDigger.com ranked Elizabeth 449th of 558 districts evaluated in New Jersey.

These and other indicators reveal a seriously declining performance standard in the city's schools. Data reported by the state Department of Education showed that a majority of students in a majority of the Elizabeth public schools failed basic skills tests.

In the 2008–09 school year, Victor Mravlag Elementary School No. 21 was recognized with the Blue Ribbon School Award of Excellence by the United States Department of Education, the highest award an American school can receive. For the 2006–2007 school year, William F. Halloran Alternative School #22 was one of four schools in New Jersey recognized with the Blue Ribbon Award. William F. Halloran Alternative School #22 earned a second award when it was one of 11 in the state to be recognized in 2014 by the National Blue Ribbon Schools Program. Terence C. Reilly School No. 7 was honored by the National Blue Ribbon Schools Program in 2019, one of nine schools in the state recognized as Exemplary High Performing Schools; the school had previously won the honor in 2013.

=== Private schools ===
Elizabeth is also home to several private schools. The coeducational St. Mary of the Assumption High School, which was established 1930, and the all-girls Benedictine Academy, which is run by the Benedictine Sisters of Saint Walburga Monastery, both operate under the auspices of the Roman Catholic Archdiocese of Newark. The Newark Archdiocese also operates the K–8 schools Our Lady of Guadalupe Academy and St. Genevieve School, which was founded in 1926.

Saint Patrick High School was closed by the Newark Archdiocese in June 2012 due to increasing costs and declining enrollment. Administrators and parents affiliated with the defunct school came together to open an independent non-denominational school on Morris Avenue called "The Patrick School" in September 2012.

The Benedictine Preschool, operated by the Benedictine Sisters, is housed at Saint Walburga Monastery.

The Jewish Educational Center comprises the Yeshiva of Elizabeth (nursery through sixth grades), the Rav Teitz Mesivta Academy (for boys in grades 6–12) and Bruriah High School (for girls in grades 7–12).

Princeton University was founded in 1746 in Elizabeth as the College of New Jersey.

=== Libraries ===
The Elizabeth Public Library, the free public library with a main library, originally a Carnegie library, and three branches had a collection of 384,000 volumes and annual circulation of about 115,000 in 2016.

== Transportation ==
=== Roads and highways ===
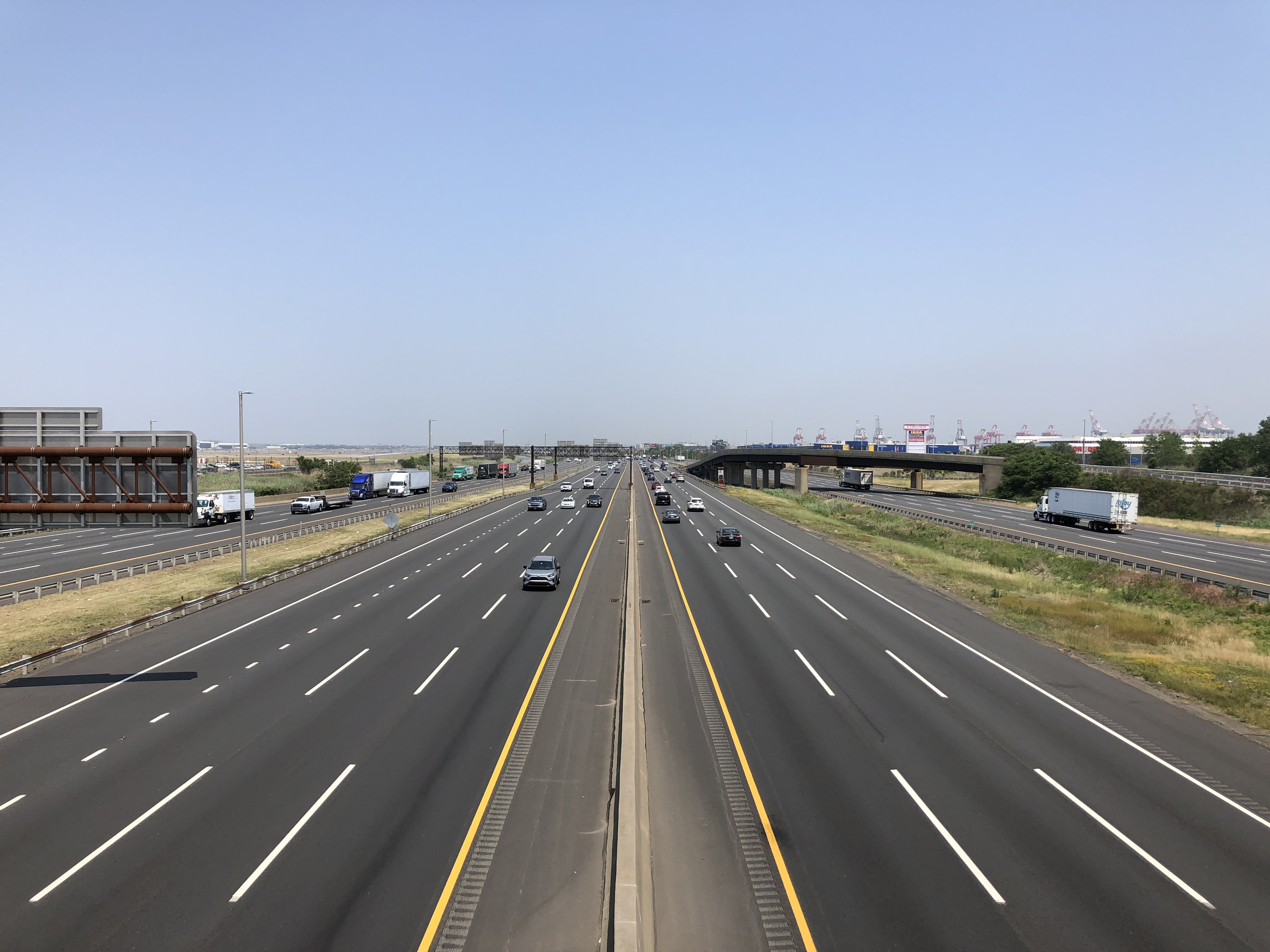
Northbound Interstate 95/New Jersey Turnpike in Elizabeth

Elizabeth is a hub of several major roadways including the New Jersey Turnpike / Interstate 95, Interstate 278 (including the Goethals Bridge, which carries Interstate 278 over the Arthur Kill between Elizabeth and Howland Hook, Staten Island), U.S. Route 1/9, Route 27, Route 28, Route 81 and Route 439. Elizabeth's own street plan, in contrast to the more usual grid plan, is to a large degree circular, with circumferential and radial streets centered on the central railroad station.

As of May 2010, the city had a total of 153.78 miles (247.48 km) of roadways, of which 123.75 miles (199.16 km) were maintained by the municipality, 12.27 miles (19.75 km) by Union County, 11.80 miles (18.99 km) by the New Jersey Department of Transportation and 5.96 miles (9.59 km) by the New Jersey Turnpike Authority.

There are numerous crossings of the Elizabeth River. The city was once home to several smaller bascule bridges. The South First Street Bridge over the river, originally built in 1908, was replaced by a fixed span. The South Front Street Bridge, built in 1922, has been left in the open position since March 2011. A study is underway to determine if the bridge can be rehabilitated. The bridge is the only remaining movable road bridge in Union County.

Elizabeth's transportation network is noted for having two of the most dangerous intersections in the United States, based on traffic deaths from 2000 to 2019. East Jersey St and US-1&9 had 9 fatal accidents over the 20-year period, while East Grand St and US-1&9 (just 1,150 feet to the North) had 7 fatal crashes over the 20-year period.

=== Public transportation ===
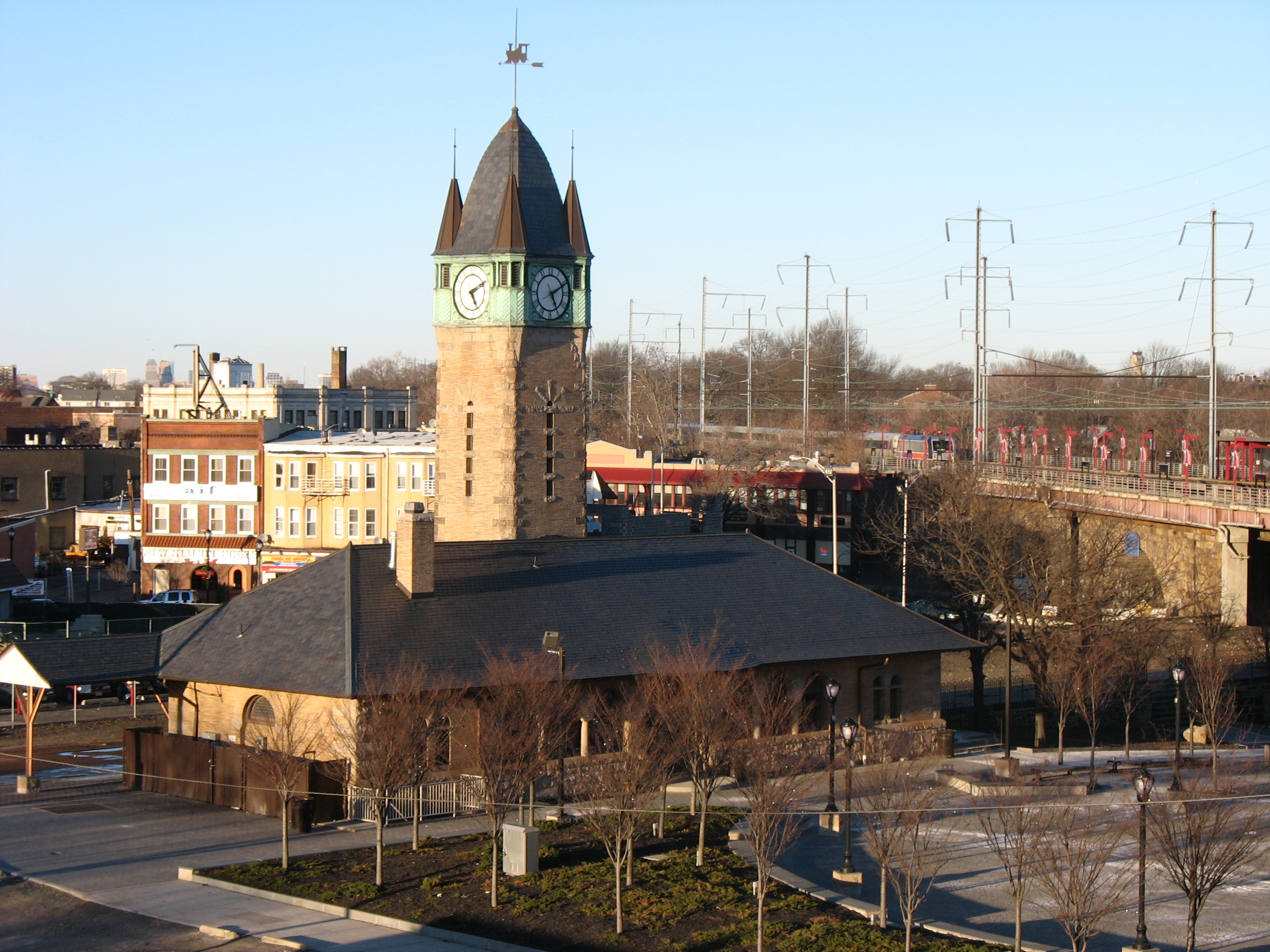
CNJ's former Elizabeth Broad Street train station, completed in 1893 or 1894, with the current NJT station in the background

Elizabeth is among the U.S. cities with the highest train ridership. Commuter rail service is offered by NJ Transit at two active stations in Elizabeth. Elizabeth station, also called Broad Street Elizabeth or Midtown Station, is the southern station in Midtown Elizabeth. The other train station in Elizabeth is North Elizabeth station. The stations are served by the Northeast Corridor Line and the North Jersey Coast Line, providing service to Newark Penn Station, Secaucus Junction and New York Penn Station.

NJ Transit has planned a segment of the Newark–Elizabeth Rail Link (NERL), designated as the Union County Light Rail (UCLR). The UCLR was planned to connect Elizabeth station with Newark Liberty International Airport and have seven or eight other stations in between within Elizabeth city limits. A possible extension of this future line to Plainfield would link Elizabeth with the Raritan Valley Line.

NJ Transit provides bus service on the 111, 112, 113 and 115 routes to and from the Port Authority Bus Terminal in Midtown Manhattan, on the 40, 48, 59 and 62 routes to Newark, New Jersey, with local service available on the 26, 52, 56, 57 and 58 routes. NJT also provides service between Elizabeth and Newark on the 24 route.

=== Air travel ===
Newark Liberty International Airport is partially in Elizabeth.

== Local media and culture ==
WJDM at 1530 AM signed-on March 11, 1970, with studios at 9 Caldwell Place in Elizabeth. The station signed-off on January 30, 2019.

News 12 New Jersey offers weather and news channels with coverage of the city.

The Daily Journal was published in Elizabeth from 1779 to 1992, ending publication as circulation plummeted from a peak of 60,000.

=== Public-access channel ===
Residents of Elizabeth can tune into the public-access television cable channel at any time to view public information, the city bulletin board, live meetings, important health information and tips. This service is provided by Optimum on channel 18. The channel also features the top ten ranked television shows, educational facts, quote of the day, gas price statistics, and tips for keeping the city safe and clean.

== Houses of worship ==
=== Catholic churches of Elizabeth ===
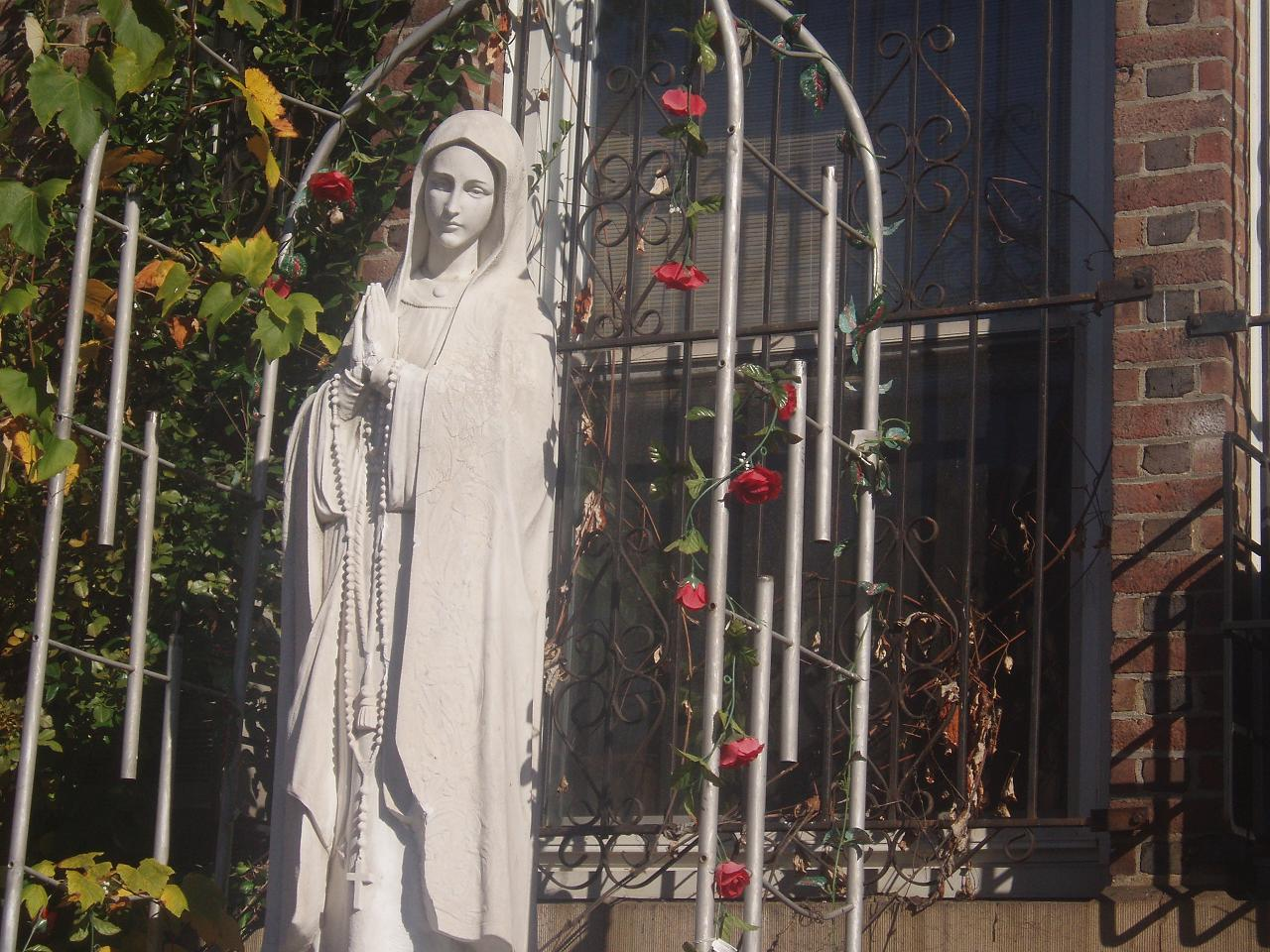
Statue of Mary in front of Immaculate Heart of Mary and St. Patrick Catholic Church in Elizabeth.

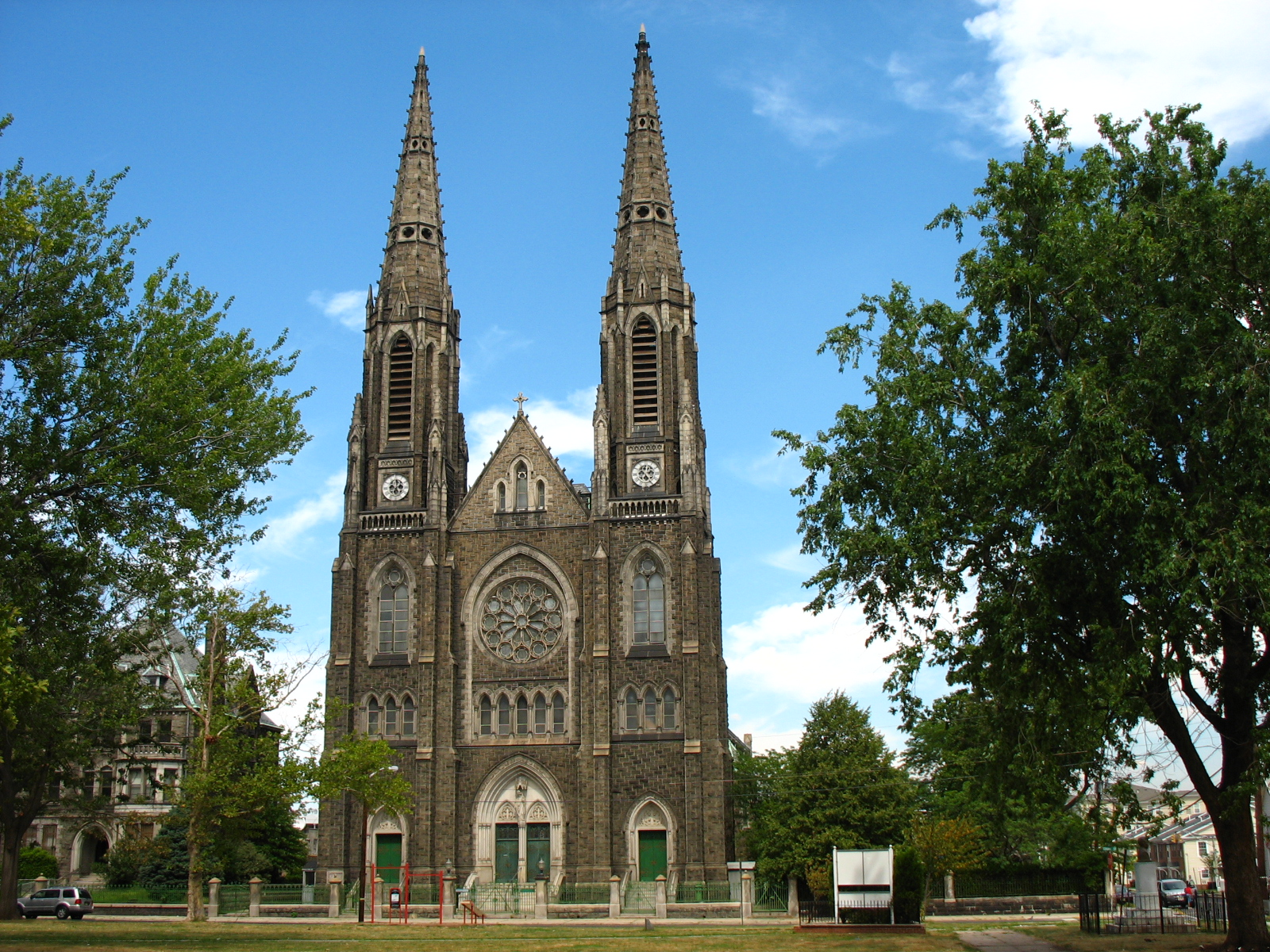
Immaculate Heart of Mary and St. Patrick Church on Court Street.

The Roman Catholic parish St. Mary of the Assumption (155 Washington Avenue, Second Avenue) was founded in 1844 and serves local Catholics with Mass and parish activities. It is affiliated with the Roman Catholic Archdiocese of Newark and is named for the Assumption of the Blessed Virgin Mary, the belief that Mary was taken body and soul into heaven. St. Mary of the Assumption is the oldest Catholic parish in Elizabeth. It is described by its parish history as the "Mother Church of Elizabeth and Union County."

The parish now known as Immaculate Heart of Mary and St. Patrick (215 Court Street, Ninth Avenue) was formed by the merger of St. Patrick (founded 1858) and Immaculate Heart of Mary (founded 1947). Originally known as St. Patrick's Church, the edifice on Court Street was constructed from 1889 to 1901 at a cost of $400,000 based on a design by J. William Schickel. It originally served the city's Irish immigrant population and reflects elements of Gothic Revival ecclesiastical architecture. It offers regular worship services, with Mass frequently celebrated in both English and Spanish. The parish is affiliated with the Roman Catholic Archdiocese of Newark and is named for the Catholic devotion known as the Immaculate Heart of Mary as well as for the patron saint of Ireland, Saint Patrick. Following the parish merger in the early 21st century, the Court Street church building continues in use and is now known as Immaculate Heart of Mary and St. Patrick Church. Immaculate Heart of Mary and St. Patrick was commemorated with a 125th anniversary Mass in November 2024, marking its opening in 1899.

The church known as Our Lady of the Most Holy Rosary and St. Michael (52 Smith Street, Cherry Street) serves a multilingual community with Mass in English, Spanish, and French Creole. It is affiliated with the Roman Catholic Archdiocese of Newark and was formed by the merger of St. Michael (founded 1852) and Most Holy Rosary (founded 1886). It is named for Our Lady of the Rosary, one of the various names of the mother of Jesus, and the archangel Michael. The parish St. Adalbert and Saints Peter and Paul (250 East Jersey Street, Cherry Street) was established as St. Adalbert in 1905 with its church building dedicated in 1906, later merging with the Lithuanian Saints Peter and Paul parish. It celebrates Mass in English, Polish, and Lithuanian. It is affiliated with the Roman Catholic Archdiocese of Newark and is named for Adalbert of Prague, Saint Peter and Paul the Apostle.

The parish Blessed Sacrament Church (1096 North Avenue, Madison Avenue) was founded in 1922 and serves parishioners with regular Masses, including services in English and Spanish, and devotional activities. It is affiliated with the Roman Catholic Archdiocese of Newark and takes its name from the Catholic devotion to the Blessed Sacrament, which is another name for the Eucharist, believed by Catholics to be the real presence of Christ in consecrated bread and wine.

St. Genevieve (200 Monmouth Road, Elmora Avenue) was founded as a mission in 1920 and its current church was built in 1930; it offers regular liturgies, community service, and ministries. It is affiliated with the Roman Catholic Archdiocese of Newark and is named for Genevieve of Paris, a 5th-century saint known for her piety and intercession for her city. The parish St. Hedwig (600 Myrtle Street, Meeker Avenue) was founded in 1925 and serves worshipers with Mass in English and Polish, including bilingual services. It is affiliated with the Roman Catholic Archdiocese of Newark and is named for Hedwig of Silesia, a 13th-century duchess and saint known for charity.

The Roman Catholic parish Immaculate Conception (417 Union Avenue) was established in 1910 and serves parishioners with regular Masses and sacraments. It is affiliated with the Roman Catholic Archdiocese of Newark and is named for the Immaculate Conception, the Catholic teaching that Mary was conceived without original sin.

Our Lady of Fatima (403 Spring Street) was founded in 1973 to serve the local Portuguese-speaking community with worship and cultural ministries. It is affiliated with the Roman Catholic Archdiocese of Newark and is named for Our Lady of Fátima, the title of Mary based on the Marian apparitions reported in Fátima, Portugal in 1917.

The Roman Catholic parish St. Anthony of Padua (853 Third Avenue, Madison Avenue) was established in the late 19th century to serve immigrant Catholics in Elizabeth and is part of the Roman Catholic Archdiocese of Newark. The parish is named for Anthony of Padua, a 13th‑century Franciscan priest and Doctor of the Church known for his preaching and devotion to the poor. It celebrates Mass in both English and Spanish and supports a diverse congregation. The parish was historically staffed by religious orders, with sisters and priests participating in parish ministries; parishioners recall nuns serving the community in sacramental preparation and other ministries in the mid‑20th century. St. Anthony's has also been served by priests from the Salesians.

=== Other denominations ===
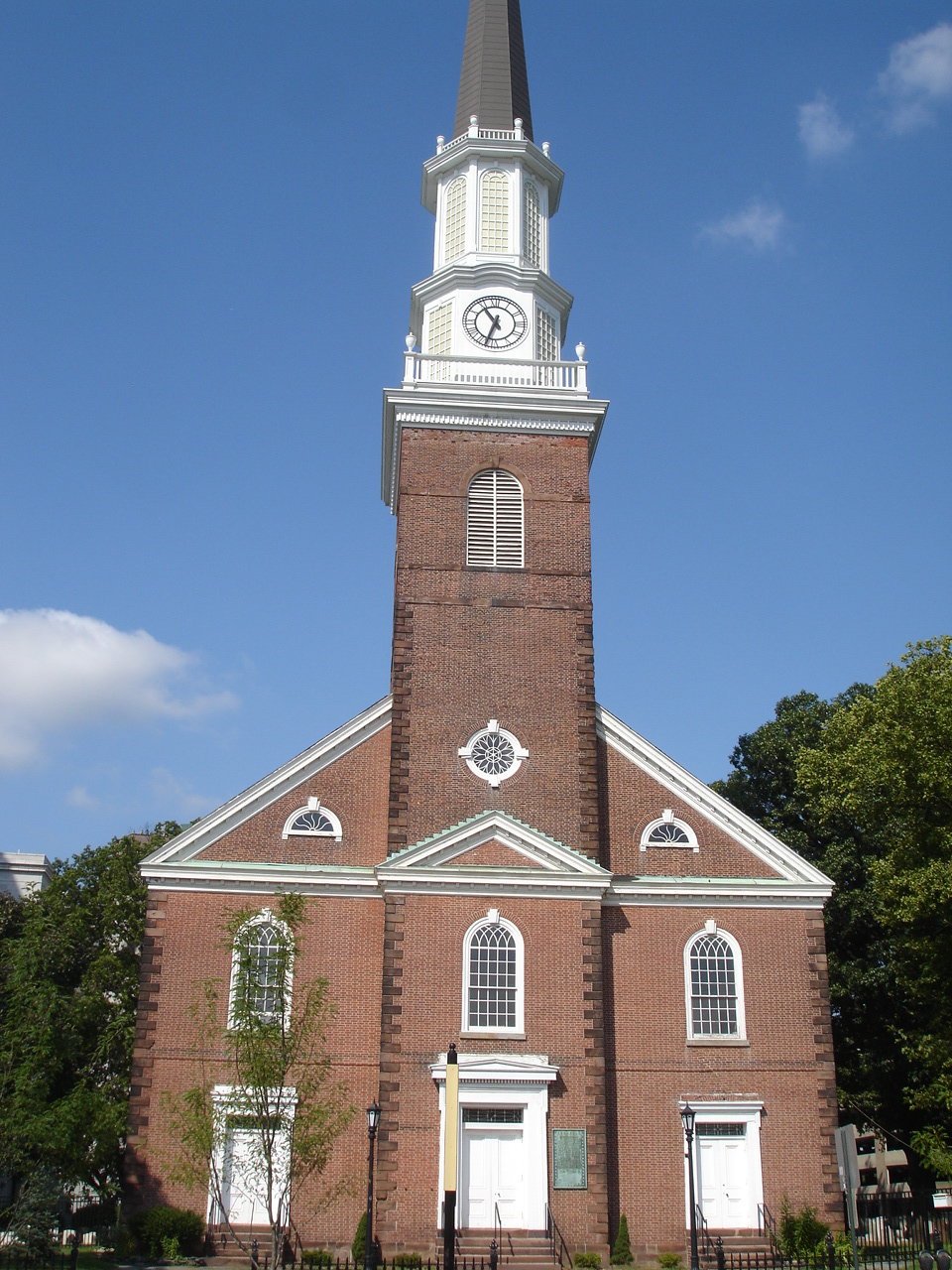
Siloam Hope First Presbyterian Church

The Presbyterian congregation Siloam Hope First Presbyterian Church (14–44 Broad Street, East Grand Street) was constructed from 1783 to 1793, replacing a former structure destroyed by the British in 1780, and traces its roots to the founding of Elizabethtown in 1664. It holds regular worship services and community ministries. The Anglican/Episcopal congregation at St. John's Episcopal Church (61 Broad Street, First Avenue) was founded by missionaries of the Society for the Propagation of the Gospel and has a cornerstone dating to 1706. It remains active with regular worship and community programs.

The Lutheran congregation in Elizabeth includes St. Luke's Evangelical Lutheran Church (908 East Jersey Street, Fifth Avenue), serving regular worship and community ministries. The Eastern Orthodox community includes Saint Fanourios Greek Orthodox Church (1034 East Jersey Street, First Avenue), providing liturgical services and community programs for Orthodox Christians. The United Church of Christ congregation Christ Church of Elizabeth holds worship services and community outreach activities.

The Reform Jewish congregation Adath Jeshurun (Murray Street Shul) was incorporated in 1921 and serves Jewish worshipers with services, education, and cultural programs.

== In popular culture ==
- In the opening credits of the HBO crime drama The Sopranos, part of the city is shown.
- The city is the focal point of Elizabeth native Judy Blume's 2015 novel In the Unlikely Event, the backdrop of which is three incidents that involved the crash of three commercial airliners in Elizabeth—1951 Miami Airlines C-46 crash, American Airlines Flight 6780 and National Airlines Flight 101—that took place within a period of two months in late 1951 and early 1952.
- Elizabeth is the hometown of Mary Dawn Dwyer Levov, the principal female character in Philip Roth's 1997 Pulitzer Prize–winning novel American Pastoral.

== Notable people ==
People who were born in, residents of, or otherwise closely associated with Elizabeth include:

- Asad Abdul-Khaliq (born 1980), quarterback who played for the Chicago Rush and New York Dragons of the Arena Football League
- Louis Abell (1884–1962), Olympic rower
- A. Bernard Ackerman (1936–2008), physician; a founding figure in the field of dermatopathology
- Ryan Adeleye (born 1985), Israeli-American professional soccer defender who has played for Hapoel Ashkelon
- Matthias W. Baldwin (1795–1866), inventor and machinery manufacturer, specializing in the production of steam locomotives, whose machine shop, established in 1825, grew to become Baldwin Locomotive Works
- Rick Barry (born 1944), basketball star who played for the New York Nets in the American Basketball Association and the Golden State Warriors in the NBA
- John D. Bates (born 1946), Senior United States district judge of the United States District Court for the District of Columbia
- Eugene J. Bedell (1928–2016), politician who served in the New Jersey General Assembly from 1972 to 1982
- Stephen Bercik (1921–2003), politician; mayor of Elizabeth from 1956 to 1964
- Benjamin Blackledge (1743–1815), educator and public official
- Judy Blume (born 1938), author
- Duke Bootee (1951–2021), early hip hop record producer and rapper
- Elias Boudinot (1740-1821), President of the Continental Congress and early U.S. Congressman
- Todd Bowles (born 1963), head coach of the Tampa Bay Buccaneers and former NFL defensive back with the Washington Redskins and San Francisco 49ers
- David Brody (born 1930), historian; professor emeritus of history at the University of California, Davis
- Hubie Brown (born 1933), former basketball coach and current television analyst
- Antoinette Brown Blackwell (1825–1921), first woman to be ordained as a mainstream Protestant minister in the United States
- Richard Bober (1943–2022), artist best known for his work for science fiction, fantasy, and similar paperback novels
- Robert Nietzel Buck (1914–2007), broke the junior transcontinental air speed record in 1930; youngest pilot ever licensed in the United States
- N. J. Burkett (born 1962), news correspondent for WABC-TV
- William Burnet (1730–1791), physician who represented New Jersey in the Continental Congress from 1780 to 1781
- Arthur Leopold Busch (1866–1956), submarine pioneer who constructed the USS Holland SS-1
- Deidre Davis Butler (1955–2020), lawyer, disability rights activist and federal official
- James G. Butler (1920–2005), trial lawyer who was known for winning many large verdicts for plaintiffs in civil litigation, including the first in a thalidomide case
- Nicholas Murray Butler (1862–1947), winner of the Nobel Peace Prize; a founder of the Carnegie Endowment for International Peace
- Elias B. Caldwell (1776–1825), Clerk of the Supreme Court of the United States
- Joan Carroll (1931–2016), actress, known for films such as Meet Me in St. Louis and The Bells of St. Mary's
- Rodney Carter (born 1964), former NFL running back/3rd down receiver with the Pittsburgh Steelers
- Al Catanho (born 1972), former linebacker in the NFL for the New England Patriots and the Washington Redskins
- John Catlin (1803–1874), acting Governor of Wisconsin Territory
- Gil Chapman (born 1953), running back and return specialist for the University of Michigan and New Orleans Saints
- Michael Chertoff (born 1953), United States Secretary of Homeland Security
- Hiram Chodosh (born 1962), Fifth president of Claremont McKenna College in Claremont, California
- Abraham Clark (1725–1794), member of the Continental Congress who was a signer of the Declaration of Independence
- Amos Clark Jr. (1828–1912), politician and businessman who represented New Jersey's 3rd congressional district from 1873 to 1875
- Freddie 'Red' Cochrane (1915–1993), professional boxer in the welterweight (147 lb) division who became World Champion in 1941 in that class
- Jim Colbert (1941–2026), golfer and multiple winner on both the PGA Tour and Champions Tour
- Tom Colicchio (born 1962), restaurateur, chef, and judge on reality-TV program Top Chef
- Tom Coyne (1954–2017), mastering engineer
- Joseph Halsey Crane (1782–1851), Congressional representative from Ohio
- Elias Dayton (1737–1807), elected to the Continental Congress; served as mayor of Elizabethtown from 1796 to 1805; father of Jonathan Dayton
- Jonathan Dayton (1760–1824), signer of the United States Constitution and Speaker of the United States House of Representatives; Dayton, Ohio, is named for him
- John De Hart (1727–1795), delegate to the Continental Congress
- DeCavalcante crime family, one of the biggest mafia families in the U.S., is based here
- Tom DeSanto (born 1968), film producer
- Thomas G. Dunn (1921–1998), seven-term mayor of Elizabeth whose 28 years in office made him the longest-serving mayor of a U.S. city with more than 100,000 people
- Drew Esocoff (born 1957), television sports director, who is the director of NBC Sunday Night Football
- John J. Fay Jr. (1927–2003), member of the New Jersey General Assembly and the New Jersey Senate
- Chuck Feeney (1931–2023), businessman, philanthropist and the founder of The Atlantic Philanthropies, one of the largest private foundations in the world
- Charles N. Fowler (1852–1932), represented 5th congressional district in the United States House of Representatives from 1895 to 1911
- Ron Freeman (born 1947), winner of the gold medal in the 4 × 400 m relay at the 1968 Summer Olympics in Mexico City; raised there and attended Thomas Jefferson High School
- Stanton T. Friedman (1934–2019), professional ufologist
- Ralph Froehlich (1930–2014), sheriff of Union County who served for 37 years, making him the longest-serving sheriff in New Jersey history
- Minna Gale (1869–1944), Shakespearean actress
- Chris Gatling (born 1967), former NBA player
- Tom Glassic (born 1954), retired NFL offensive lineman who played for the Denver Broncos
- George Gross (1941–2010), American football defensive tackle who played in the American Football League for the San Diego Chargers
- William Halsey Jr. (1882–1959), admiral in the United States Navy during World War II, who was one of four individuals to have attained the rank of fleet admiral
- Alexander Hamilton (c. 1755–1804), lived here as a young man upon first arriving in America
- Don Harris (born 1954), former American football safety who played in the NFL for the Washington Redskins and the New York Giants
- Mary C. Henderson (1928–2012), historian of theater
- John T. Hendrickson Jr. (1923–1999), politician who represented the 9th Legislative District in the New Jersey General Assembly from 1982 to 1989
- Joseph J. Higgins (1929–2007), politician who served in the New Jersey General Assembly from 1966 to 1974
- Kyrie Irving (born 1992), basketball player who plays professionally for the NBA's Dallas Mavericks
- Raghib Ismail (born 1969), former NFL and CFL player
- Horace Jenkins (born 1974), former NBA player for the Detroit Pistons
- Leo Warren Jenkins (1913–1989), educator who served as the sixth president and chancellor of what is now East Carolina University
- Marsha P. Johnson (1945–1992), LGBTQ activist, participant in the 1969 Stonewall uprising
- I. Stanford Jolley (1900–1978), film and television actor who starred in the 1946 serial film The Crimson Ghost
- Phineas Jones (1819–1884), represented New Jersey's 6th congressional district from 1881 to 1883
- Karl Kaimer (born 1938), former American football tight end who played one season with the New York Titans of the American Football League
- Arnie Kantrowitz (1940–2022), LGBT activist and college professor
- Michael Kasha (1926–2019), physical chemist and molecular spectroscopist who collaborated with Andrés Segovia to create the Kasha Design classical guitars
- John Kean (1852–1914), represented New Jersey in the United States Senate from 1899 to 1911; served two separate terms in the United States House of Representatives, from 1883 to 1885, and from 1887 to 1889, representing New Jersey's 3rd congressional district
- James C. Kellogg III (1915–1980), Chairman of the Port Authority of New York and New Jersey
- Daniel Hugh Kelly (born 1952), stage, film and television actor; was born and raised there
- Daniel C. Kurtzer (born 1949), United States Ambassador to Egypt from 1997 to 2001 and United States Ambassador to Israel from 2001 to 2005
- Thomas Lanigan-Schmidt (born 1948), artist and participant in the 1969 Stonewall uprising
- Mark Allen Lanoue, scientist, inventor, musician, singer and songwriter
- Chauncey D. Leake (1896–1978), pharmacologist, medical historian and ethicist
- Jay Lethal (born 1985 as Jamar Shipman), All Elite Wrestling and Ring of Honor professional wrestler
- William Livingston (1723–1790), signer of the United States Constitution and the first elected Governor of New Jersey, he lived there and built his home, Liberty Hall
- Virginia Long (born 1942), former justice on the New Jersey Supreme Court
- Zenaida Manfugás (1932–2012), Cuban-American pianist who was considered one of the first black pianists in Cuba
- Emilie Martin (1869–1936), mathematician and professor of mathematics at Mount Holyoke College
- Patrick McDonnell (born 1956), cartoonist, author and playwright who is the creator of the syndicated daily comic strip Mutts
- Analilia Mejia (born 1977), activist, politician, non-profit director, and US Representative for New Jersey's 11th congressional district.
- James P. Mitchell (1900–1964), served as United States Secretary of Labor from 1953 to 1961; ran unsuccessfully for Governor of New Jersey
- Thomas Mitchell (1892–1962), Oscar and Tony Award-winning actor; was born there
- Hank Mobley (1930–1986), hard bop jazz saxophonist
- John Morris (1926–2018), film, television and broadway composer, dance arranger, conductor and trained concert pianist, best known for his collaborations with filmmakers Mel Brooks and Gene Wilder
- Don Newcombe (1926–2019), pitcher who spent most of his career with the Brooklyn/Los Angeles Dodgers
- Marissa Paternoster (born 1986), artist, singer and guitarist in the bands Screaming Females and Noun
- Elizabeth Peña (1959–2014), actress
- Fernando Perez (born 1983), San Francisco Giants coach who played as an outfielder for the Tampa Bay Rays
- Lorenzo Da Ponte (1749–1838), Italian-born librettist and poet
- Stephanie Pogue (1944–2002), artist, printmaker, and art educator
- Franklin Leonard Pope (1840–1885), telegrapher and inventor; lived there as a young man and became friends with Thomas Edison
- Elazar Mayer Preil (1878-1933), rabbi who led Elizabeth's Orthodox Jewish community
- Ahmad Khan Rahami (born 1988), naturalized U.S. citizen from Afghanistan and Elizabeth restaurant worker charged in the 2016 New York and New Jersey bombings
- James Reuter (1916–2012), Jesuit Catholic priest who lived in the Philippines
- Ron Rivers (born 1971), running back who played in the NFL for six seasons
- Jon Rua (born 1983), actor, singer and choreographer who appeared in the Broadway hit Hamilton
- Jonal Saint-Dic (born 1985), NFL player with the Kansas City Chiefs
- Sidney M. Schreiber (1915–2009), Associate Justice of the New Jersey Supreme Court from 1975 to 1984
- Debralee Scott (1953–2005), actress, known for her role in Mary Hartman, Mary Hartman
- Suzanne Shepherd (1934–2023), actress and theater director
- Martin J. Silverstein (born 1954), attorney and diplomat who served as the United States Ambassador to Uruguay under President George W. Bush from 2001 to 2005
- William Gayley Simpson (1892–1991), white nationalist and author
- Mickey Spillane (1918–2006), writer
- John H. Stamler (1938–1990), Union County, New Jersey, prosecutor from 1977 until his death
- Joseph Stamler (1911–1988), New Jersey Superior Court judge and professor at Rutgers University
- Gus Stavros (1925–2022), businessman and philanthropist
- Leo Steiner (1939–1987), co-owner of the Carnegie Deli
- Edward Stratemeyer (1862–1930), creator of the Hardy Boys, Bobbsey Twins, and Nancy Drew, he was born and resided there
- William Sulzer (1863–1941), U.S. Congressman and impeached governor of New York
- Carole Beebe Tarantelli (born 1942), American-born former member of the Italian parliament who was the first American citizen elected to the Italian Chamber of Deputies
- Tay-K (born 2000), rapper, songwriter and convicted murderer whose song "The Race" went viral following his arrest in Elizabeth, after a nationwide manhunt for murder
- Craig Taylor (born 1966), former running back for three seasons for the Cincinnati Bengals
- Hal Tulchin (1926–2017), television and video director
- Daniel Van Pelt (born 1964), politician who represented the 9th legislative district in the New Jersey General Assembly from 2008, until 2009, when he resigned after being arrested in connection with Operation Bid Rig
- General John W. Vogt Jr. (1920–2010), flying ace of the United States Army Air Forces in World War II who served as a general in the United States Air Force during the Cold War era
- Dick Vosburgh (1929–2007), comedy writer and lyricist working chiefly in Britain
- Bernie Wagenblast (born 1956), broadcaster and journalist
- Bill Walczak, community activist who ran for mayor of Boston in 2013
- Mickey Walker (1903–1981), boxer; held the Welterweight and Middleweight titles; was born and raised there; ranked #10 on Sports Illustrated's list of The 50 Greatest New Jersey Sports Figures
- Mabel Madison Watson (1872-1952), composer and music educator
- Joe Weil (born 1958), writer and active member of the New Jersey poetry scene
- Henry S. Whitehead (1882–1932), Episcopal minister and author of horror and fantasy fiction
- Tony Williams (1928–1992), R&B singer who was the lead vocalist of the Platters from 1953 to 1960
- Wendy Wolin (1958-1966), schoolgirl murdered by an unknown assailant
- Sam Woodyard (1925–1988), jazz drummer best known for his association with the Duke Ellington orchestra
- Glen Everett Woolfenden (1930–2007), ornithologist, known for his long-term study of the Florida scrub jay population at Archbold Biological Station near Lake Placid, Florida
- Albert Capwell Wyckoff (1903–1953), ordained minister of the Presbyterian Church (USA) and author of juvenile fiction, most notably the Mercer Boys series and Mystery Hunter series
- Jimmy Yacabonis (born 1992), professional baseball pitcher who played in Major League Baseball for the Baltimore Orioles, Seattle Mariners, Miami Marlins, Tampa Bay Rays, and New York Mets

== Sister cities ==
- Ribera, Sicily, Italy
- Kitami, Hokkaido, Japan, signed on June 12, 1969
