= List of Art Deco architecture in New Jersey =

There are numerous buildings that are examples of the Art Deco architecture, including Streamline Moderne, in New Jersey, United States.

== Asbury Park ==
- Deal Lake Court Apartments, 1930s
- Jersey Central Power & Light Building, 1922
- Hot Mess Studio, Asbury Park
- Old Heating Plant, Asbury Park, 1930
- The Santander, 1929
- Paramount Theatre, 1930
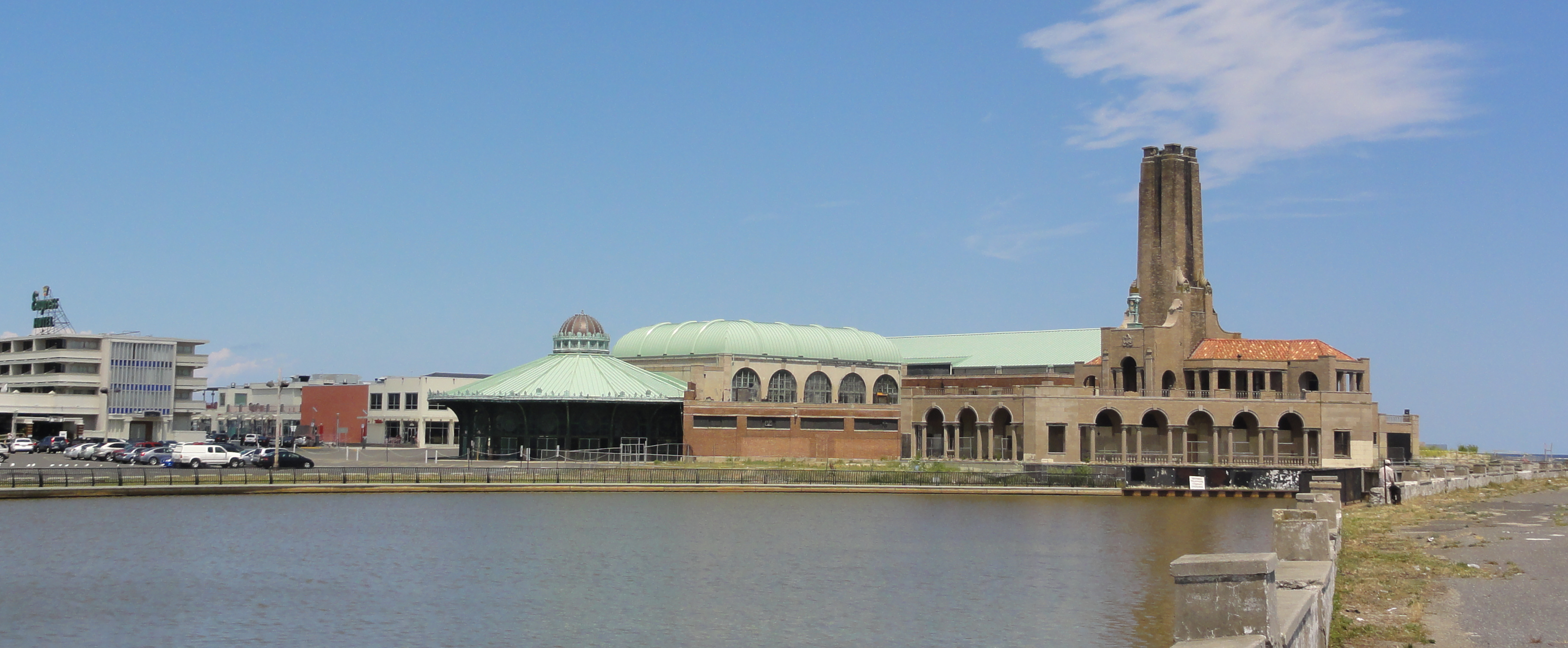
Casino and Powerhouse

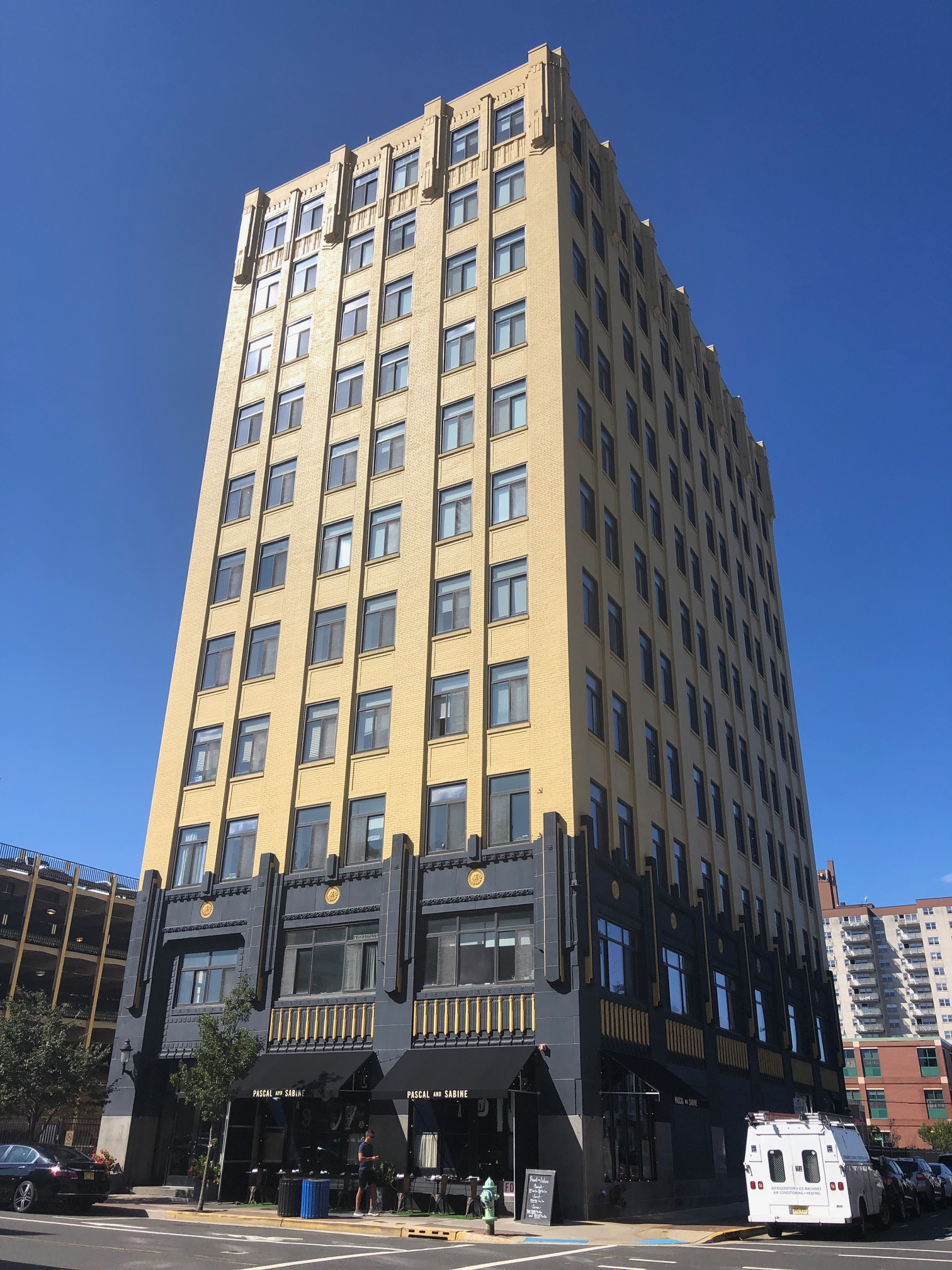
Jersey Central Power and Light

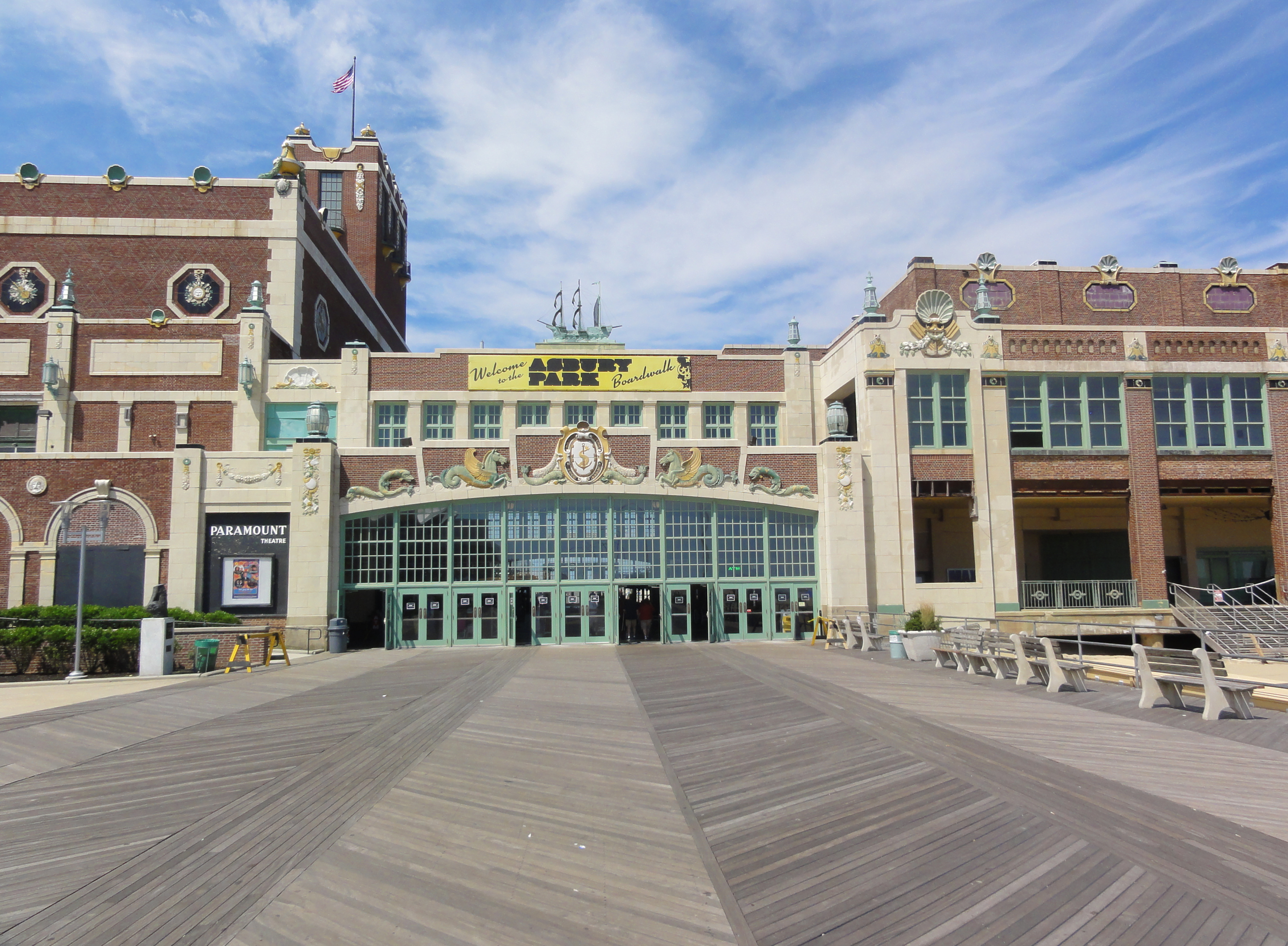
Paramount Theater and Convention Hall

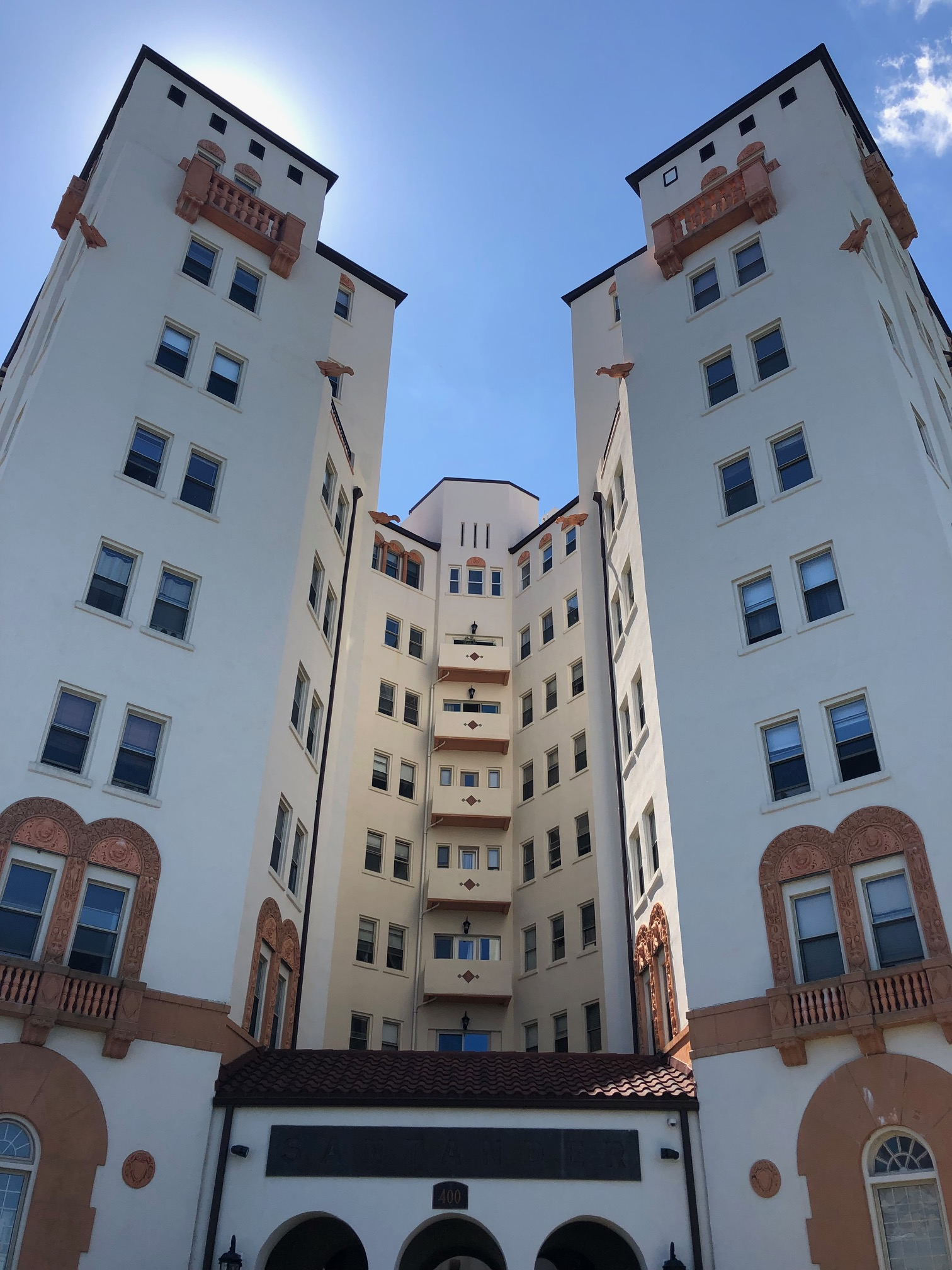
The Santander

U.S. Post Office and Courthouse Camden

== Camden ==
- City Hall, 1931
- KIPP Cooper Norcross High School
- Mastery Schools of Camden, McGraw Elementary
- McCrory's/Sam's Discount
- Pierre Building, 306 Cooper, 1932
- Rio Theatre (now a church), 1937
- United States Post Office and Courthouse, 1932

== East Orange ==
- 30 South Munn, East Orange
- East Orange VA Hospital, East Orange, 1950
- West Colonial Apartments, East Orange

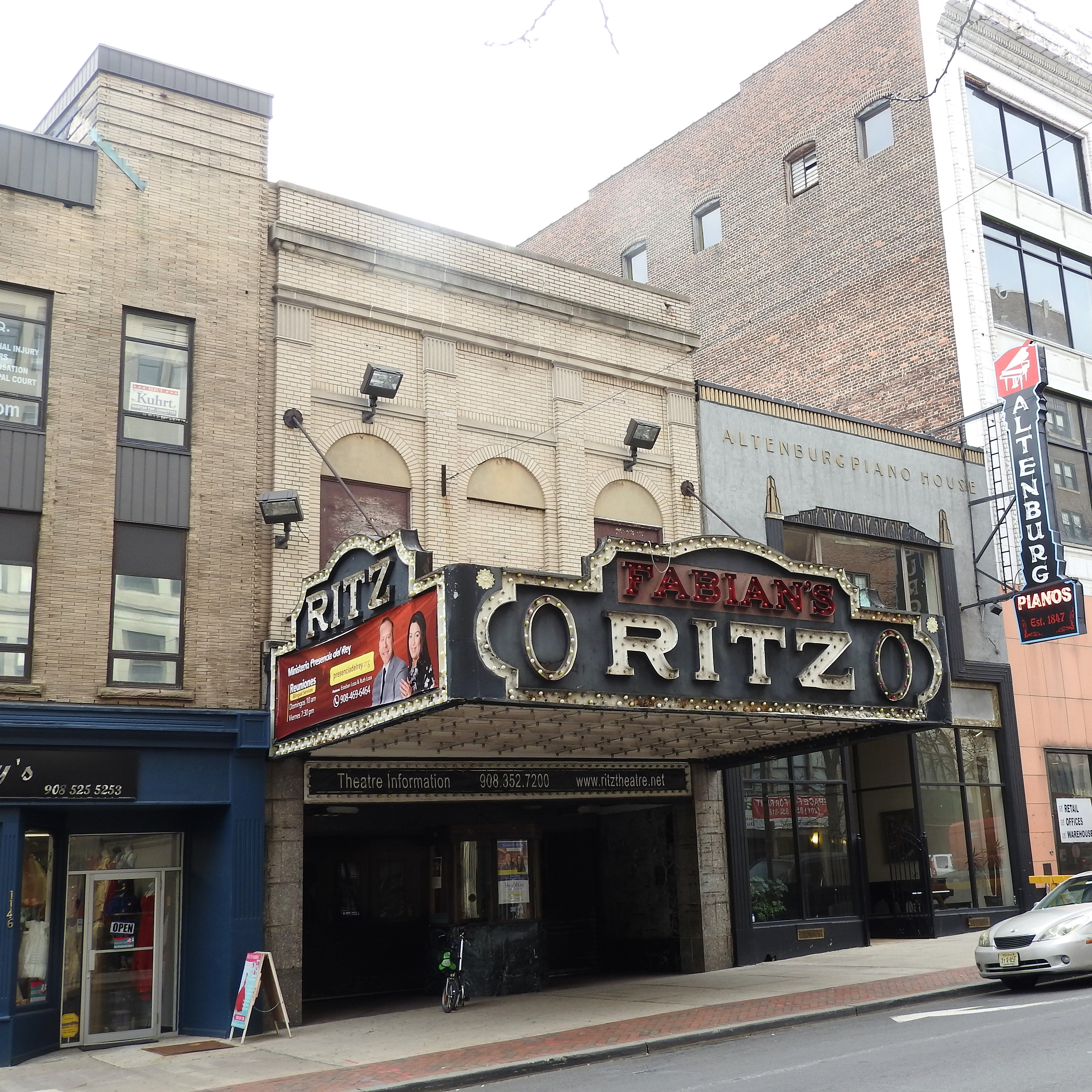
Ritz and Altenburgh House

== Elizabeth ==
- Altenburg Piano House, Elizabeth, 1929
- Hersch Tower, Elizabeth, 1931
- Ritz Theatre, Elizabeth, 1925

== Jersey City ==
- McGinley Square-Bergen Square-Journal Square corridor along Bergen Avenue: 789 (Bergen Theater; later Pix Theater), 830 (Provident Bank Headquarters, 1920), 872 (Independent Order of Odd Fellows, 1920), 875, 880 (First National Bank Building, 1920), 885, 910, 911, 918, 920 (Hurwitz Building, 1930) and 924
- 295 Newark Avenue, 1929
- 500 Communipaw Avenue (former Junction Fishery), 1920s
- A. Harry Moore School (NJCU), 1931
- Jersey City Armory
- The Beacon, former Jersey City Medical Center, 1934–1938 & Jones Hall, 591 Montgomery Street, 1939
- 596 Communipaw Avenue
- 61 Duncan Avenue
- Miss America Diner, 1942
- 65 Tonnele Avenue (Ramada Jersey City)
- Roosevelt Stadium, 1937 (demolished)
- White Mana Diner, 1931
- Ellis Island Ferry Building, c.1937
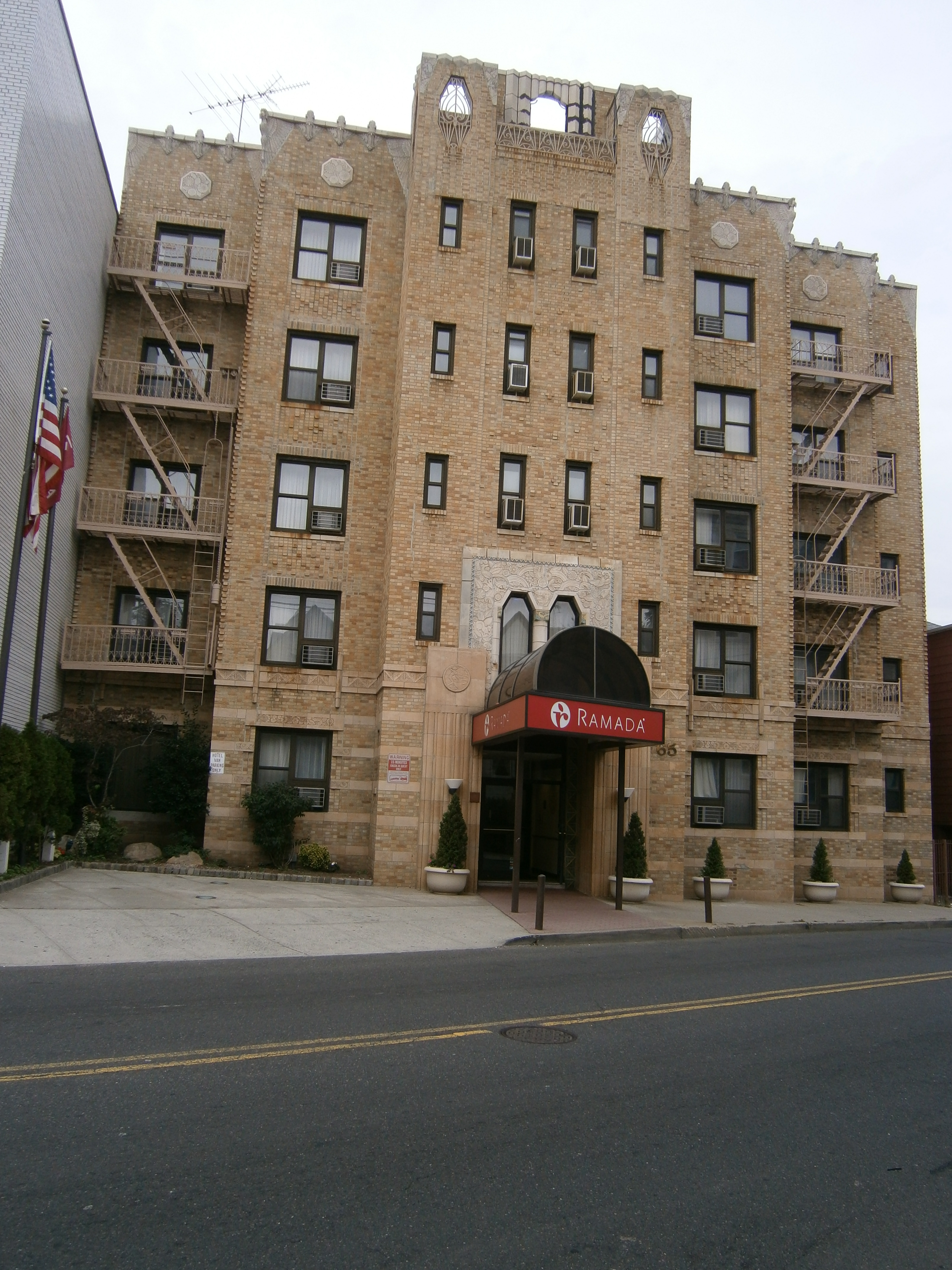
65 Tonnelle Avenue

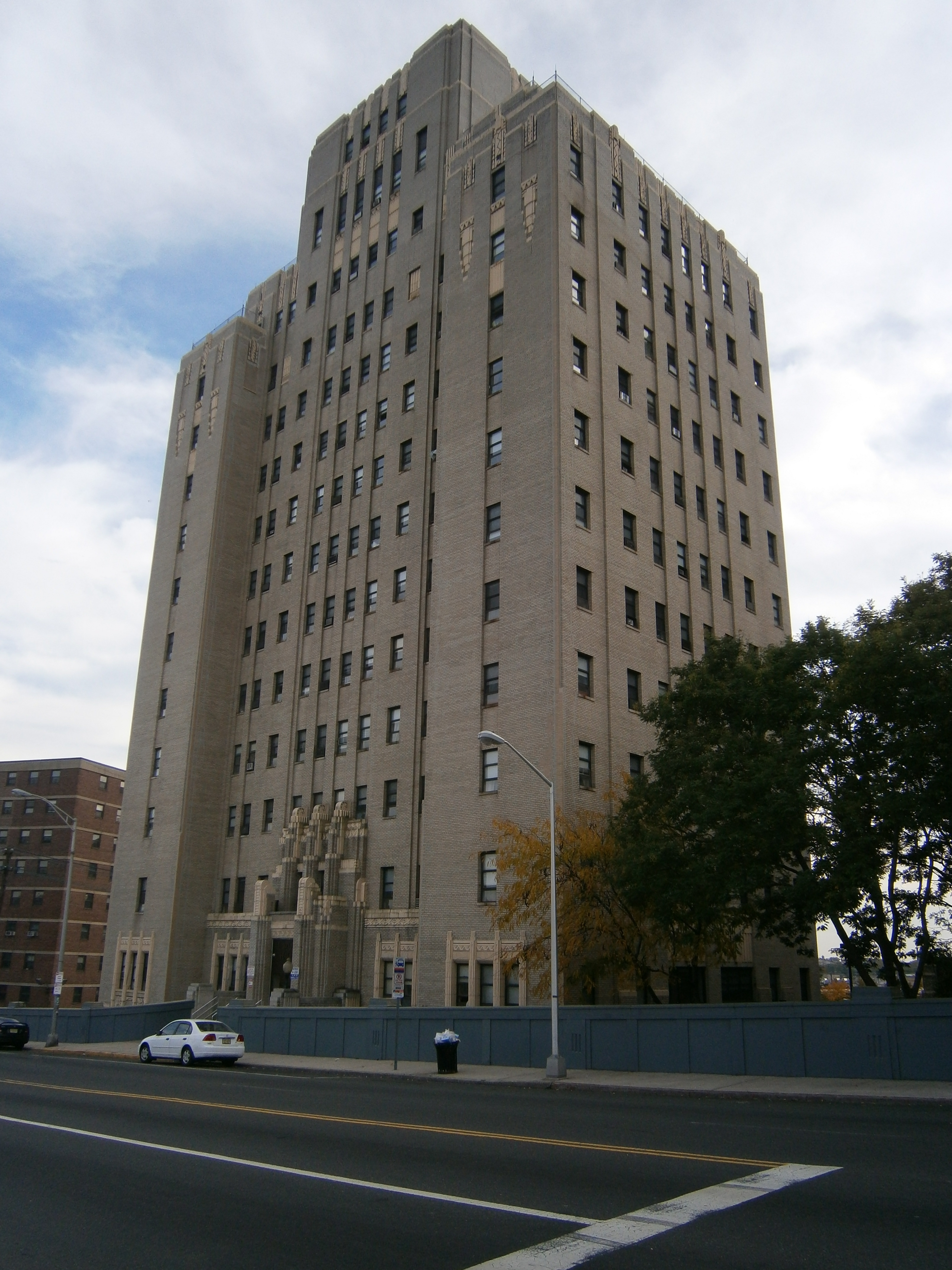
Jones Hall

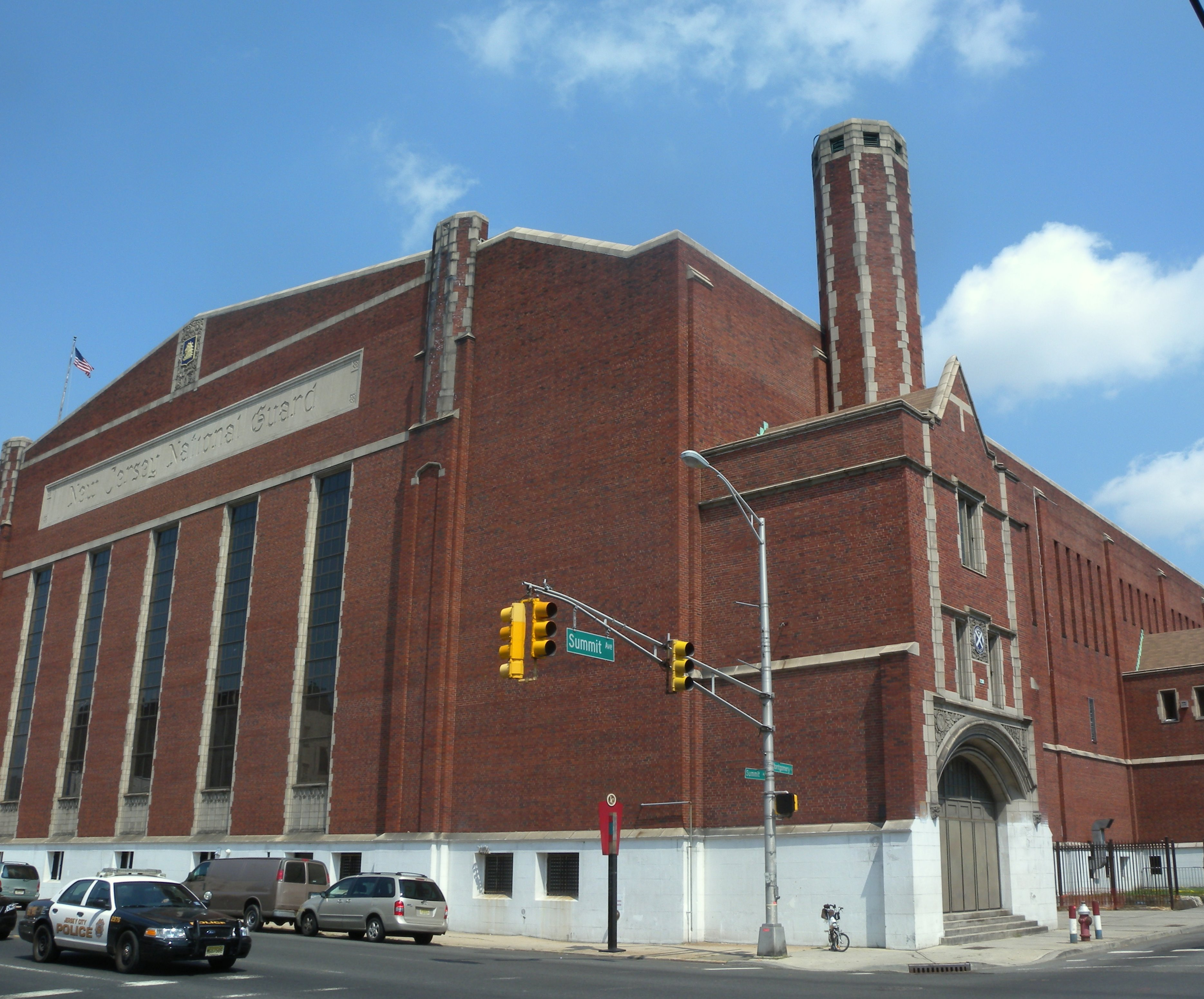
Jersey City Armory

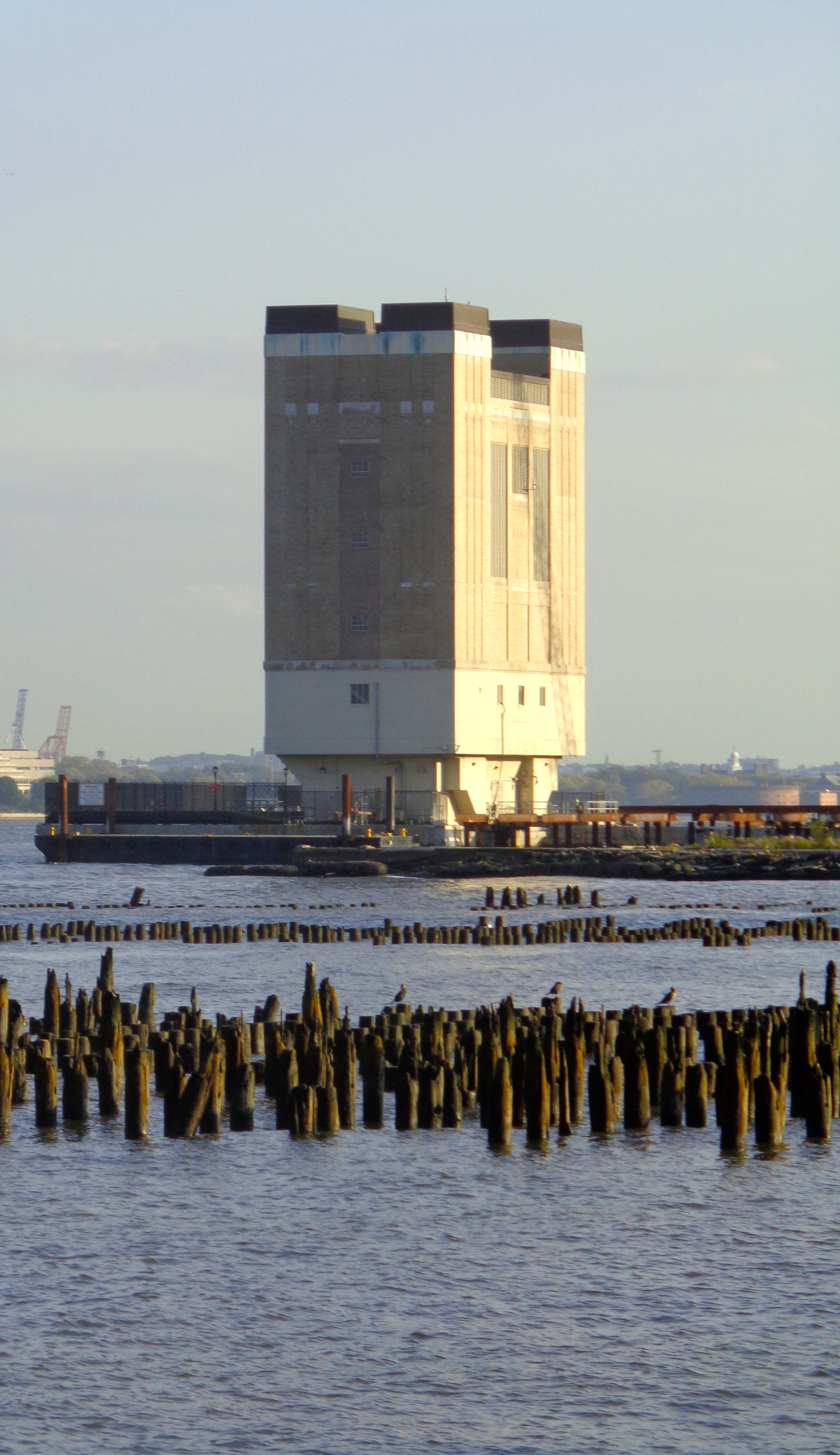
Holland Tunnel Tower

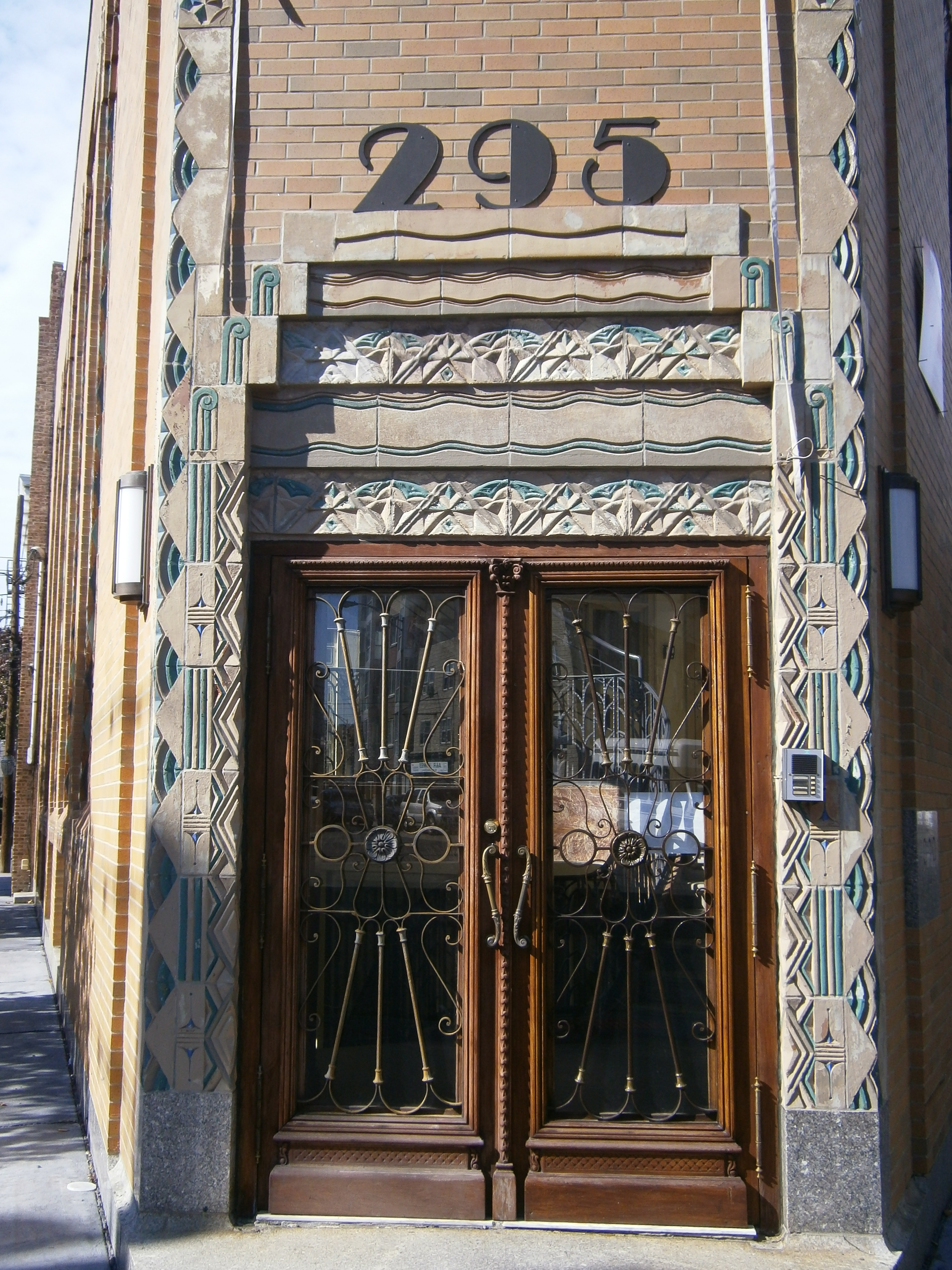
295 Newark Avenue

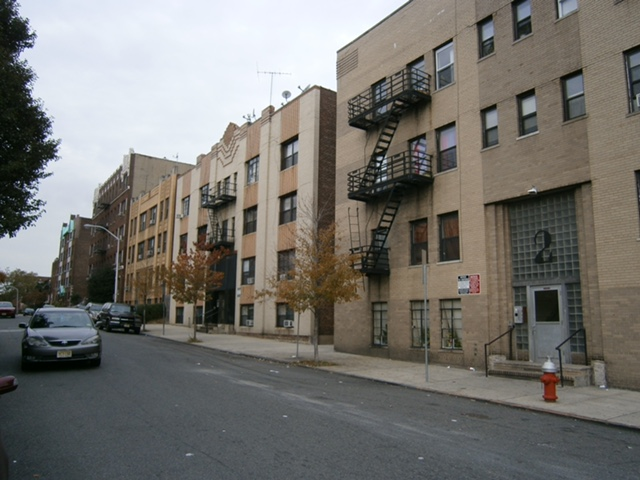
Kensington Avenue

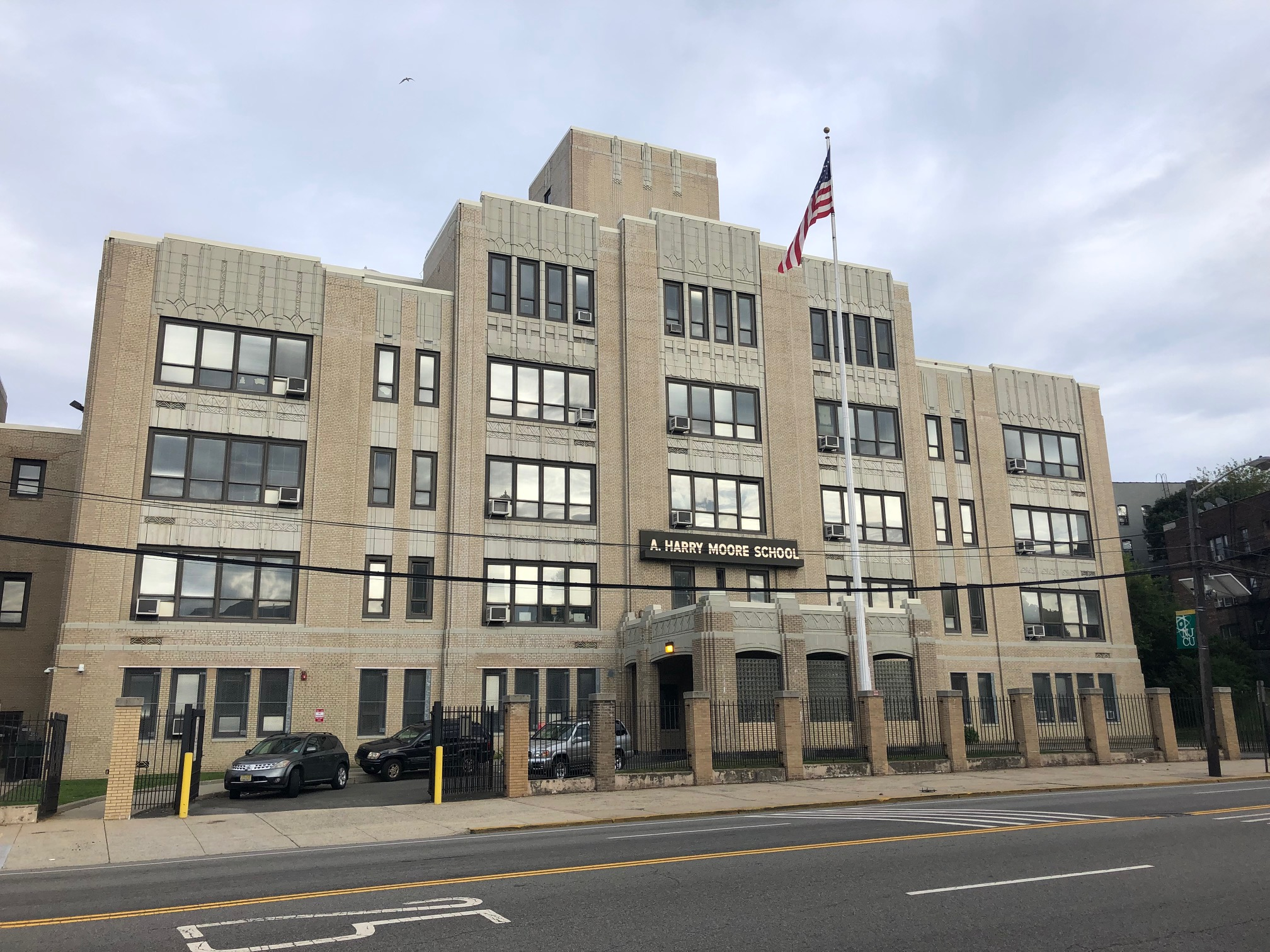
A. Harry Moore School

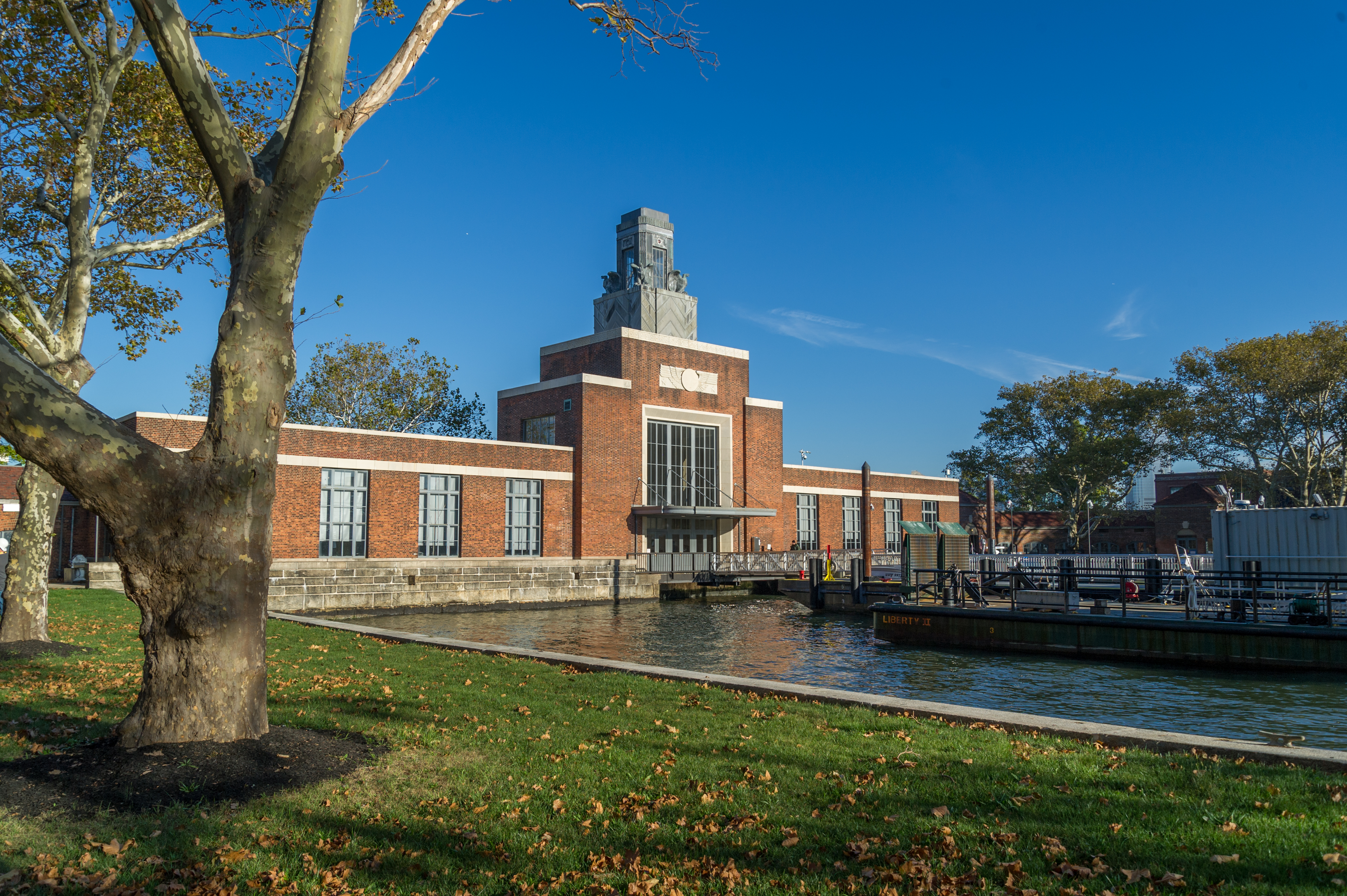
Ellis Island Ferry Building

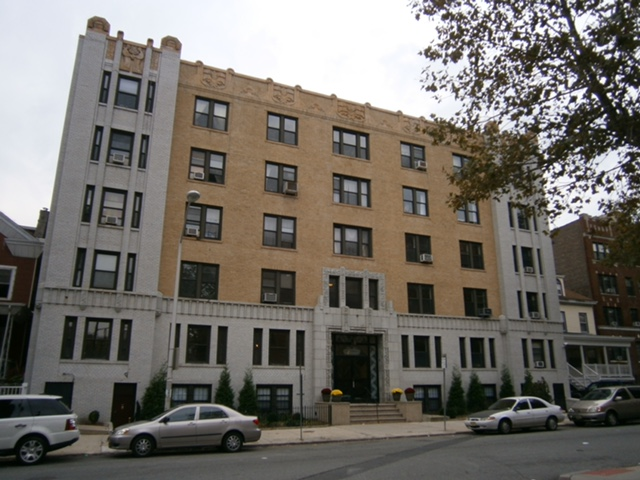
Fairmount Avenue

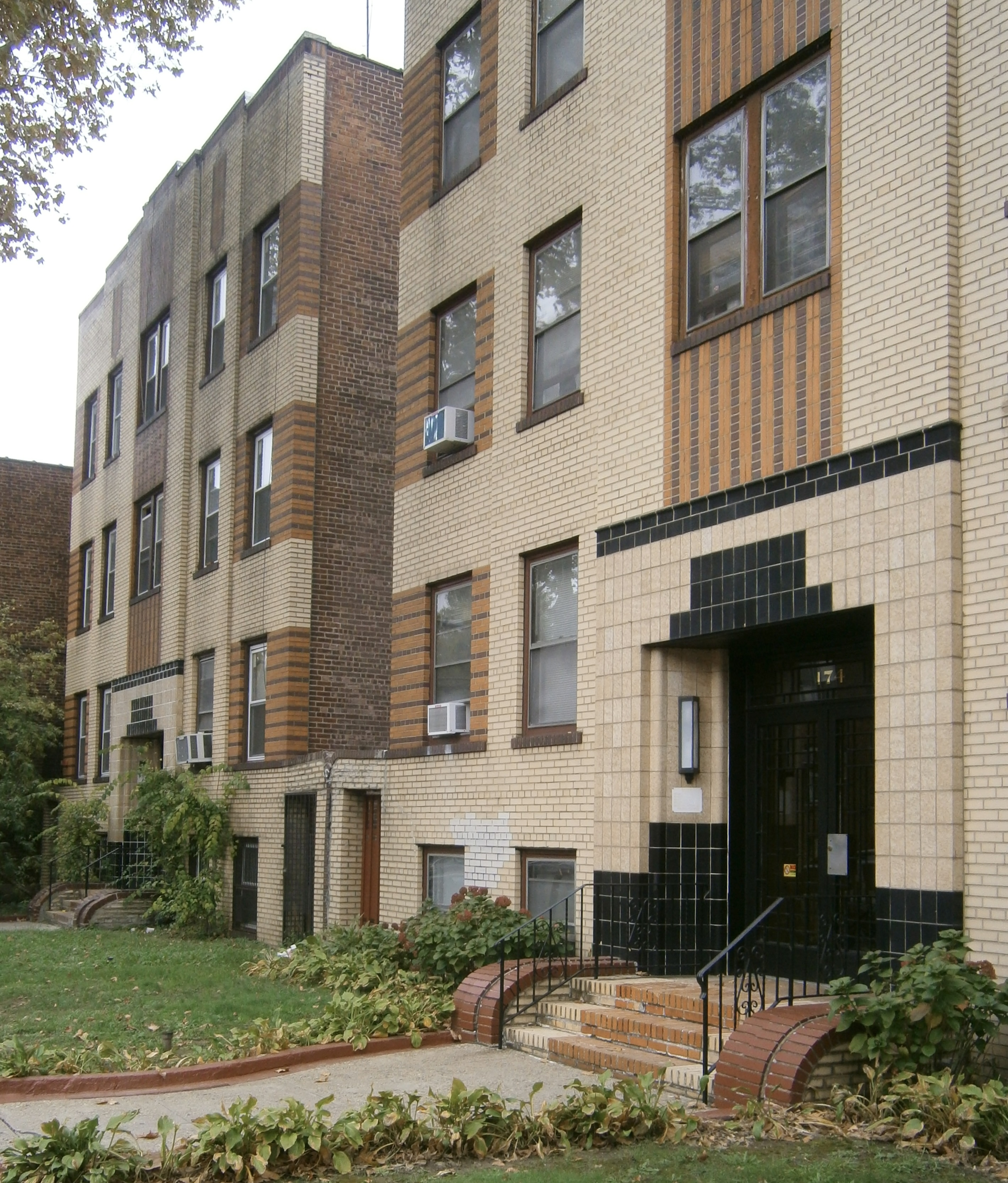
Jewett Avenue

== Newark ==
- 118-122 Market Street
- 138-138 1/2 Halsey Street, 1925
- 34 William Street, 1925
- 837-839 Broad Street, 1930
- 87 Halsey Street
- 9-13 Hill Street, 1929
- Chancellor Avenue Elementary School, 1938
- Eleven 80 (formerly Lefcourt–Newark Building), 1930
- Griffith Building, 1927
- Hotel Douglas, 5-21 Hill Street, 1923
- Ivy Hill Elementary School, 1931
- Lyons Towers Condominiums, 1939
- National Newark Building, 744 Broad Street, 1931
- Newark Arts High School (formerly Newark School of Fine and Industrial Art), 1931
- Newark Metropolitan Airport Buildings, 1928
- Newark Museum of Art
- Newark Symphony Hall (originally the Mosque Theater, 1925)
- Newark Urby, 155 Washington Street (original parking tower converted to residences)
- Paramount Theater
- Pennsylvania Station, 1935
- Science High School (demolished 2017), some original Art Deco terra cotta tiles incorporated into 50 Rector Park
- United States Savings Bank, 187 Market Street, 1929
- Walker House (formerly New Jersey Bell Headquarters Building), 540 Broad Street, 1929
- Weequahic High School, 1932
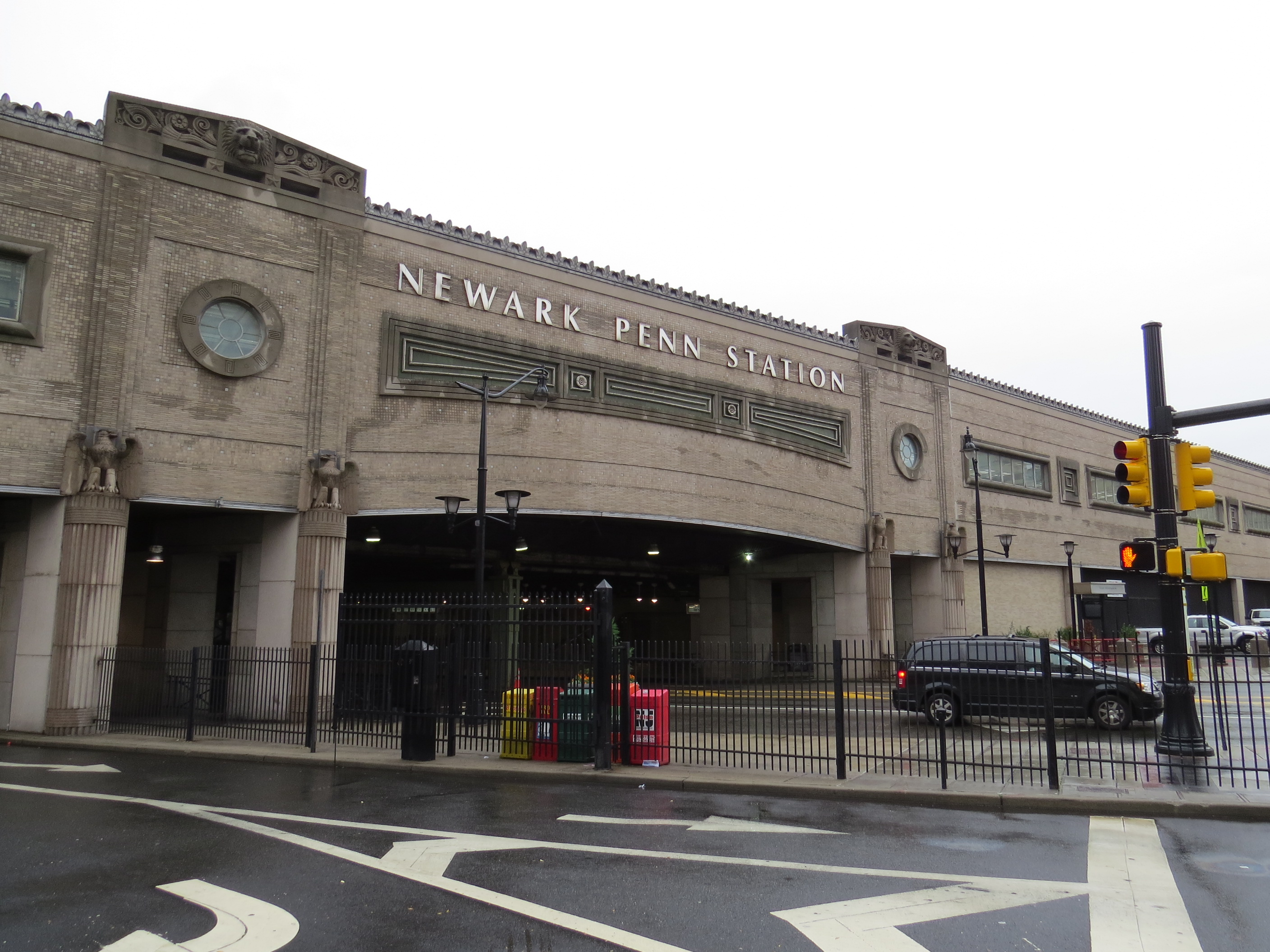
Newark Penn Station

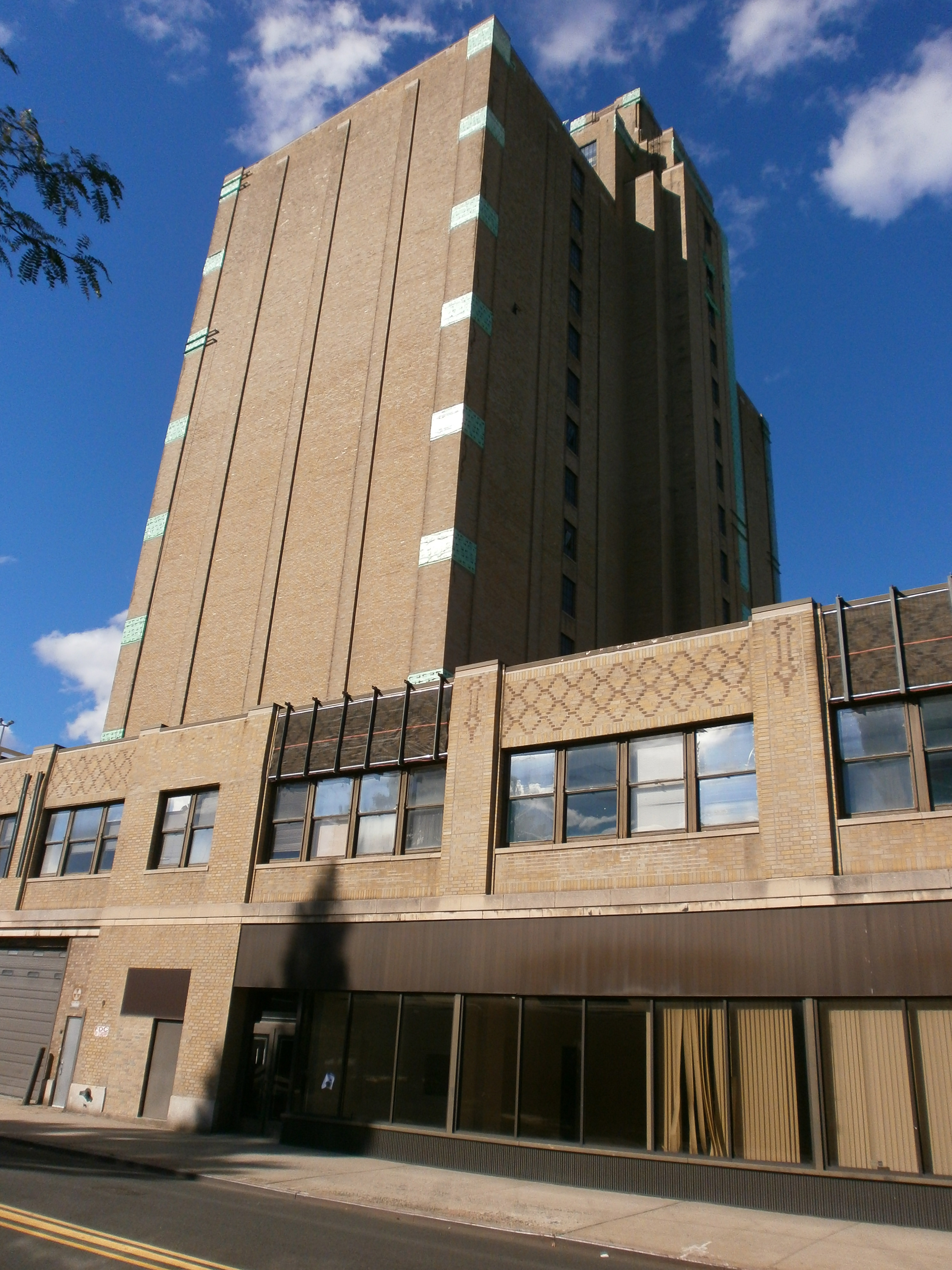
155 Washington

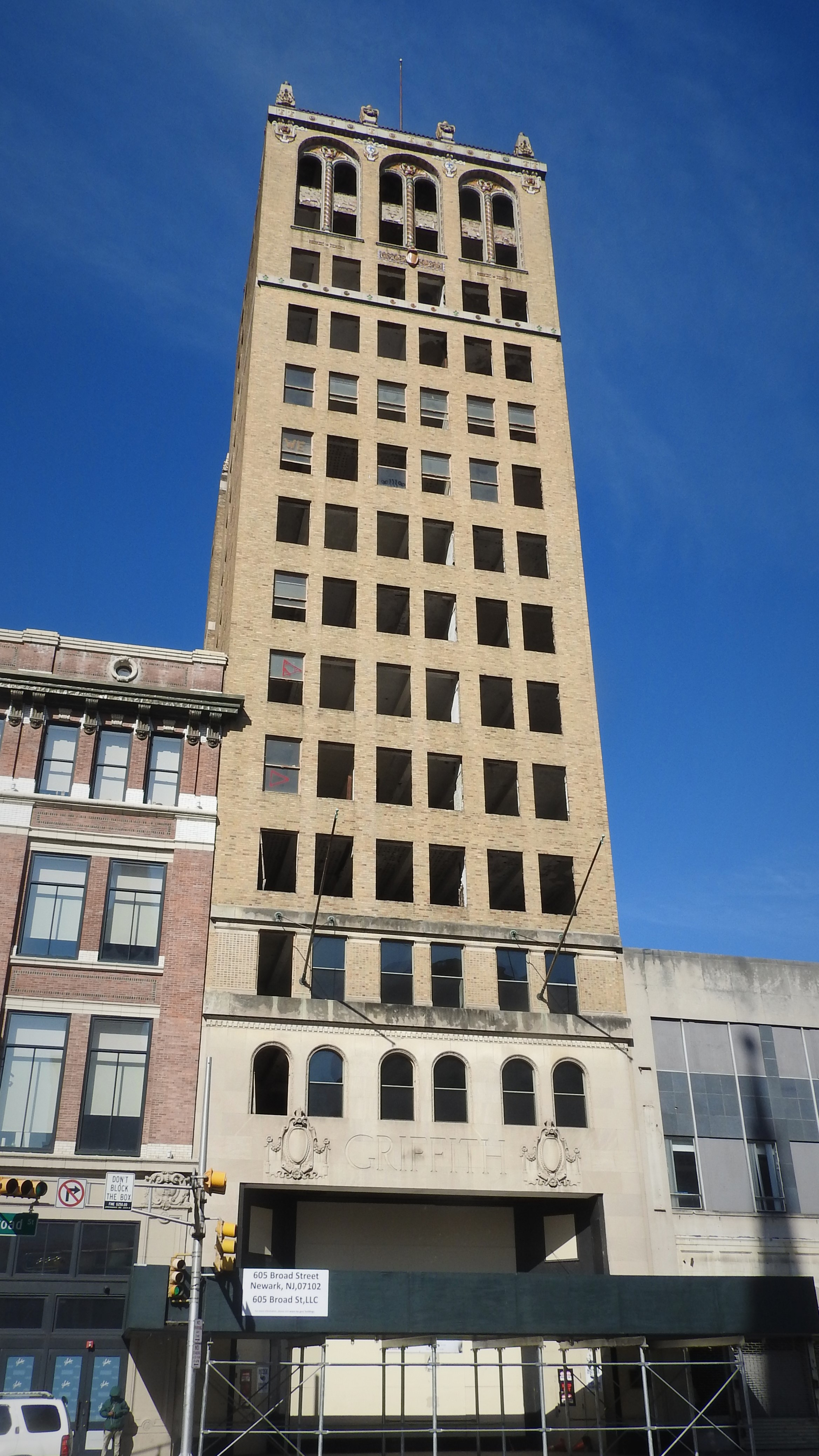
Griffith Building

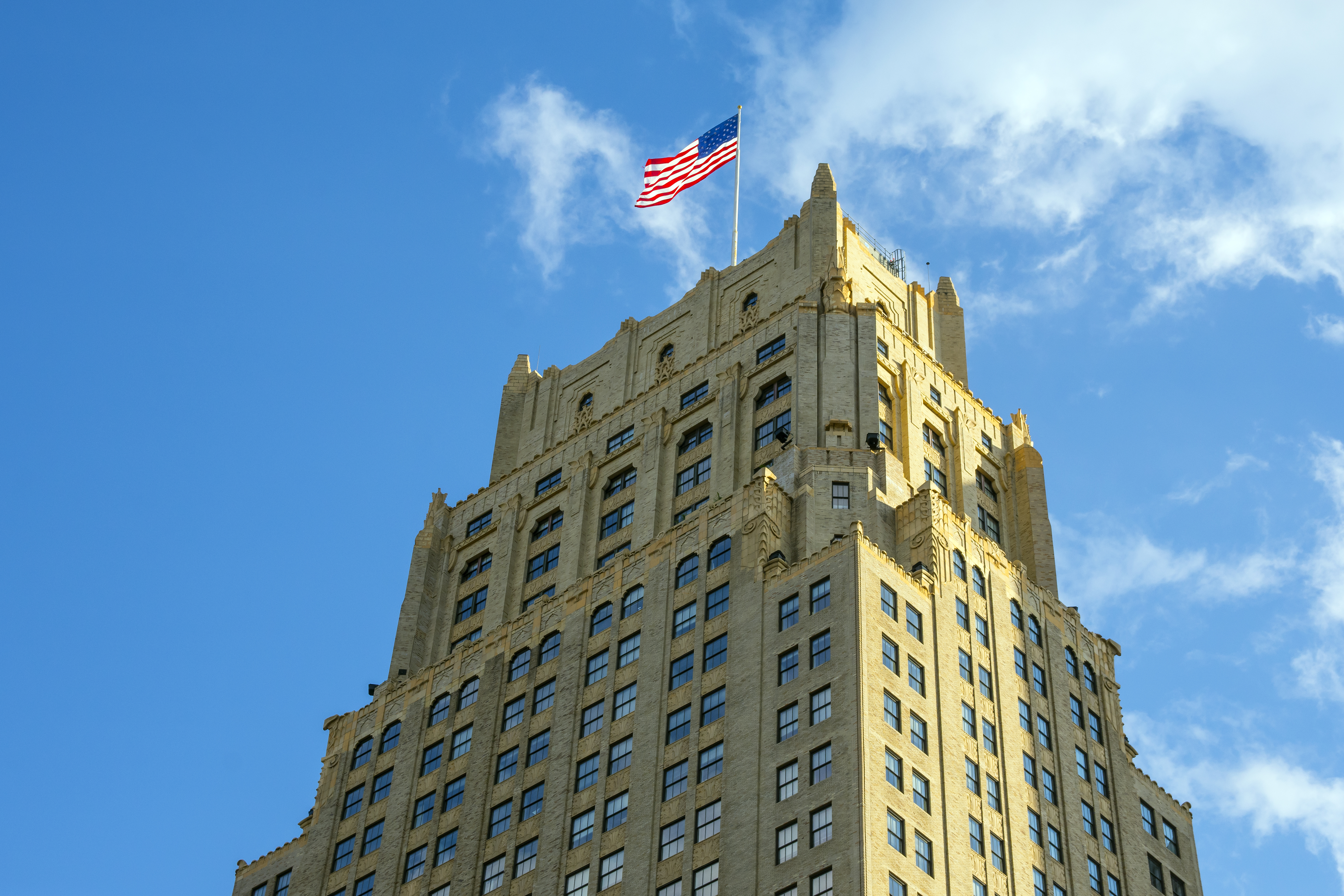
Eleven 80

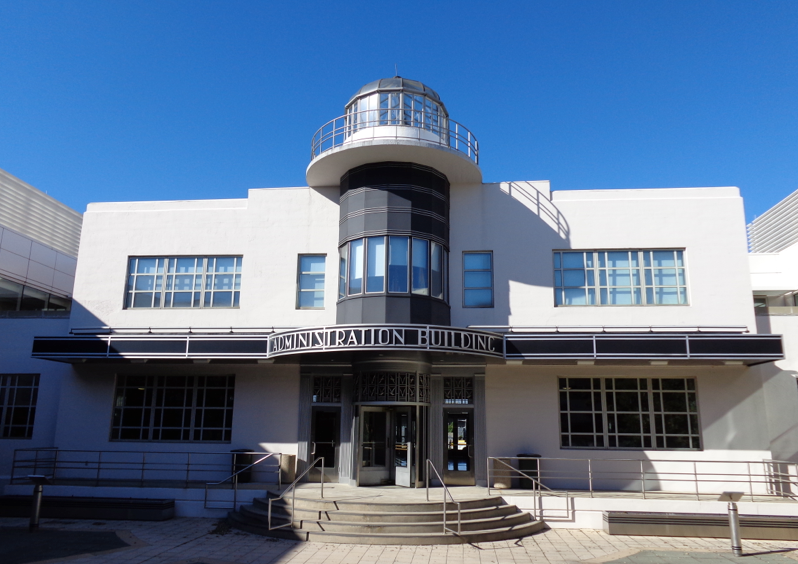
Newark Metropolitan Airport

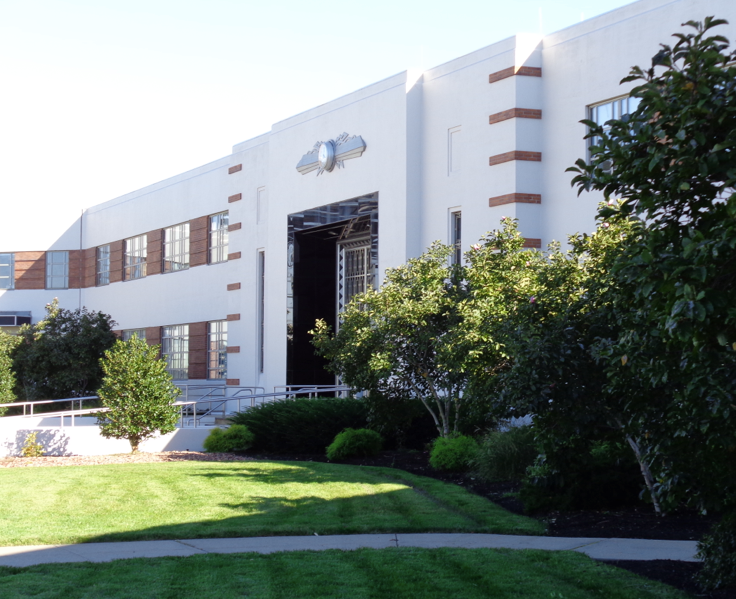
Newark Metropolitan Airport

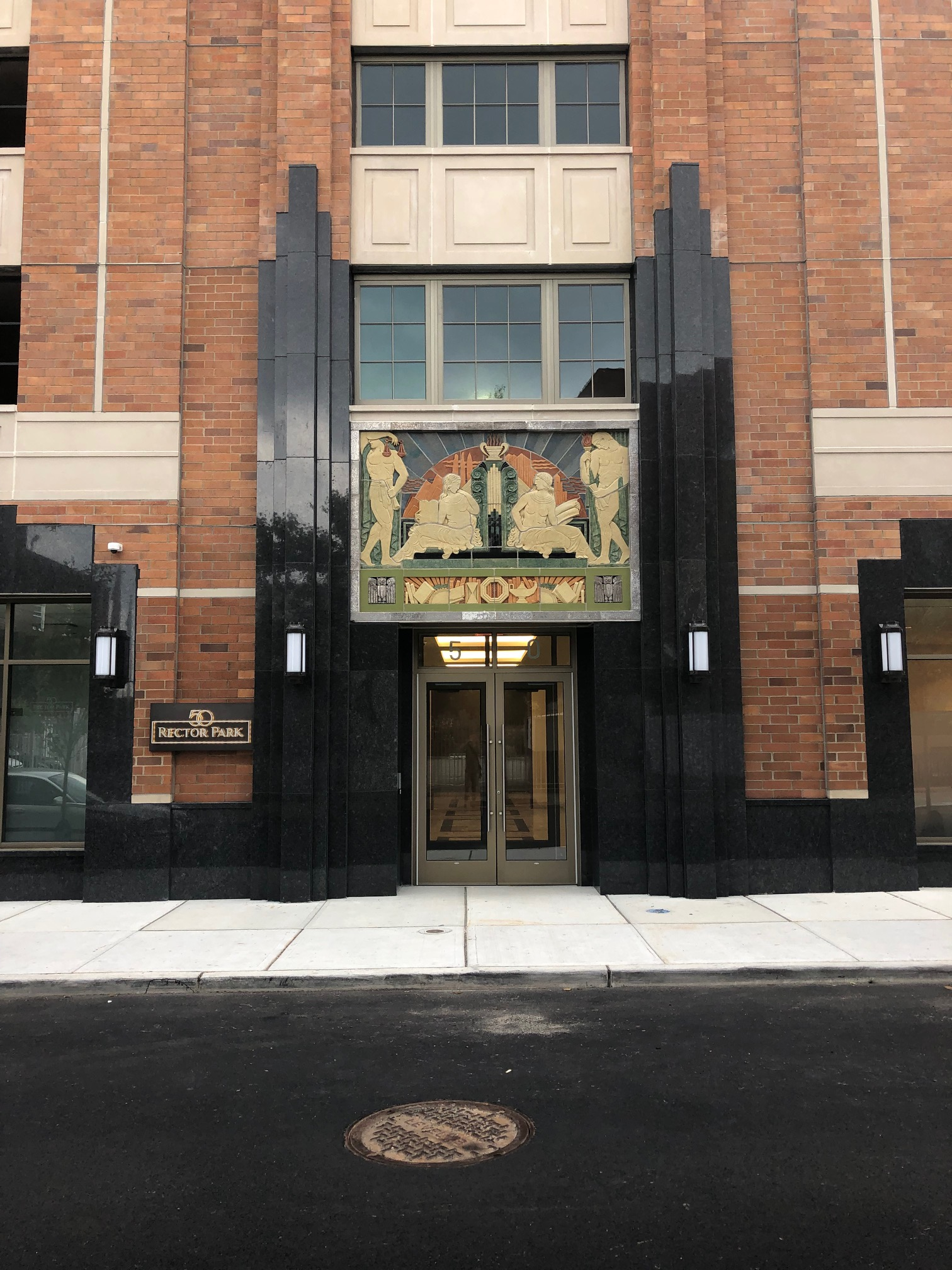
Terra cotta tiles at 50 Rector Park entrance

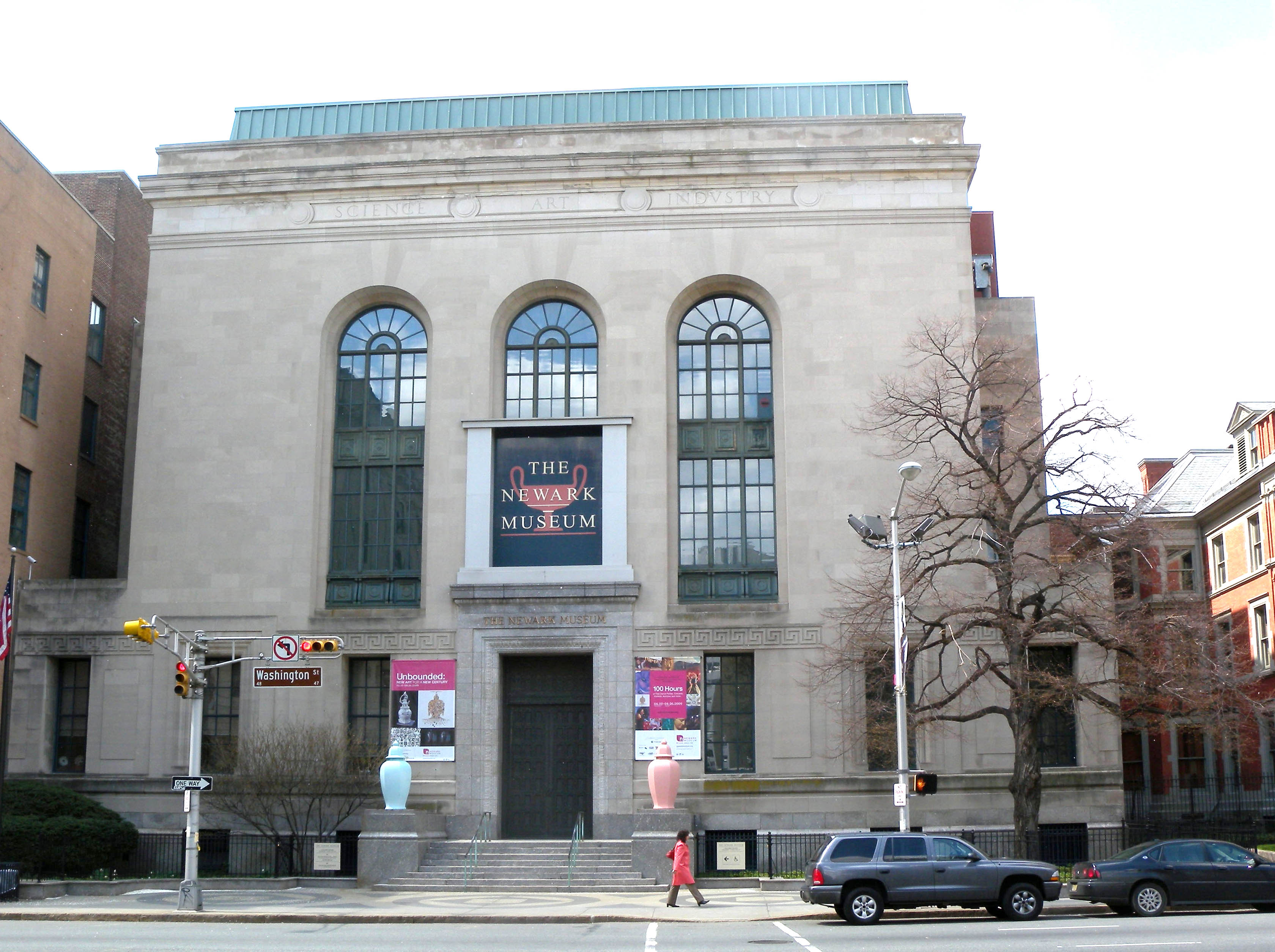
Newark Museum

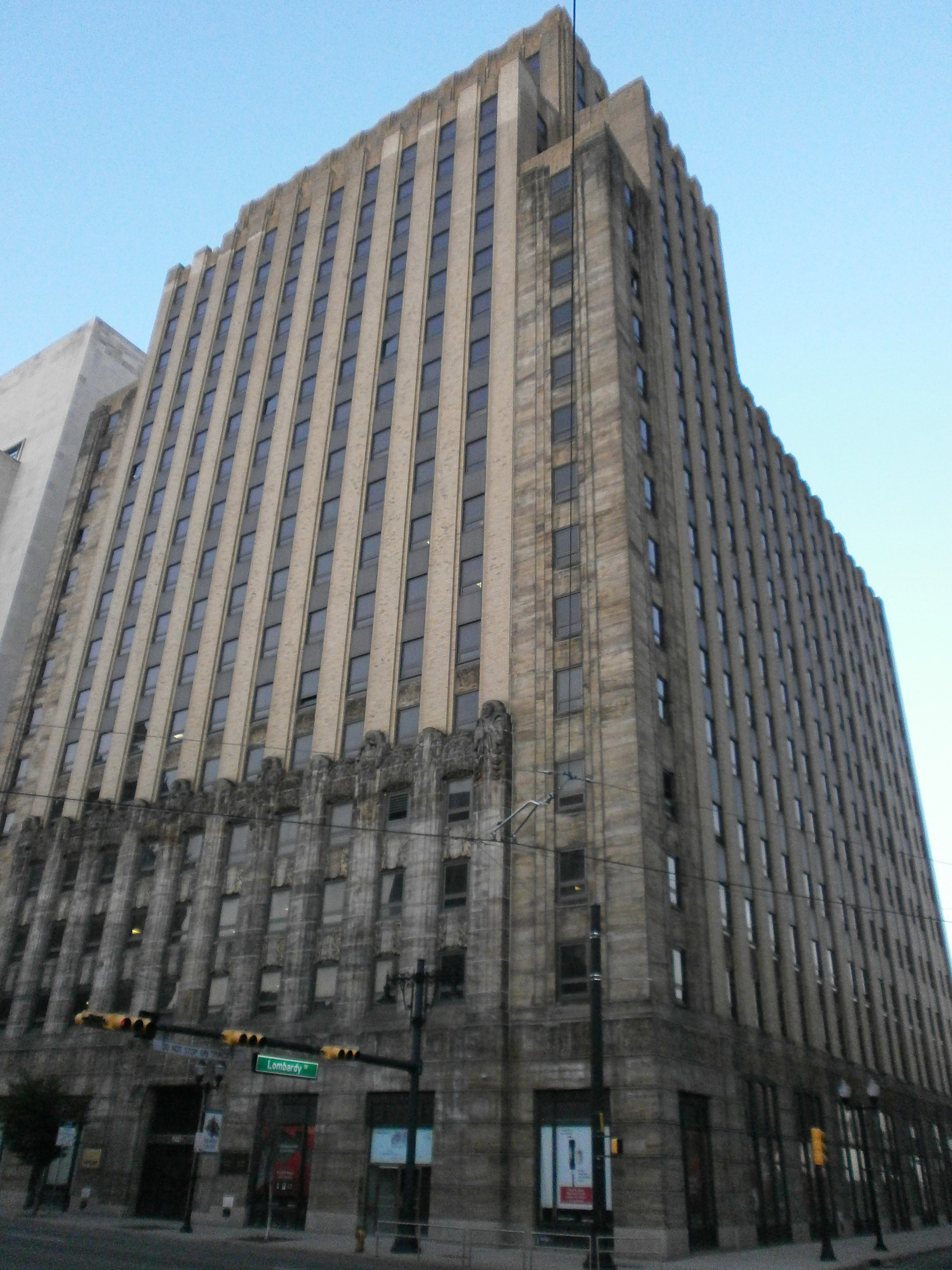
Walker House

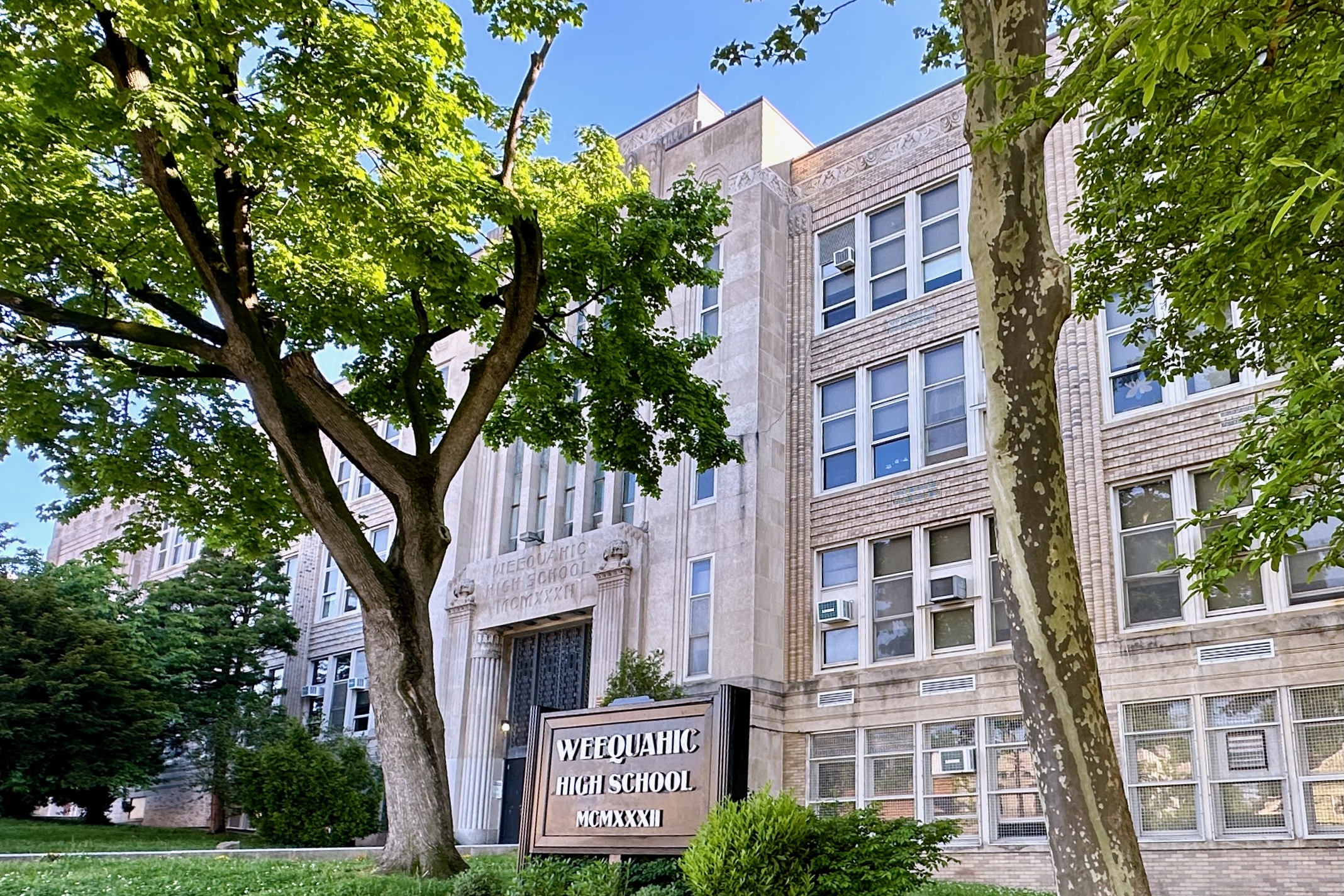
Weequahic High School

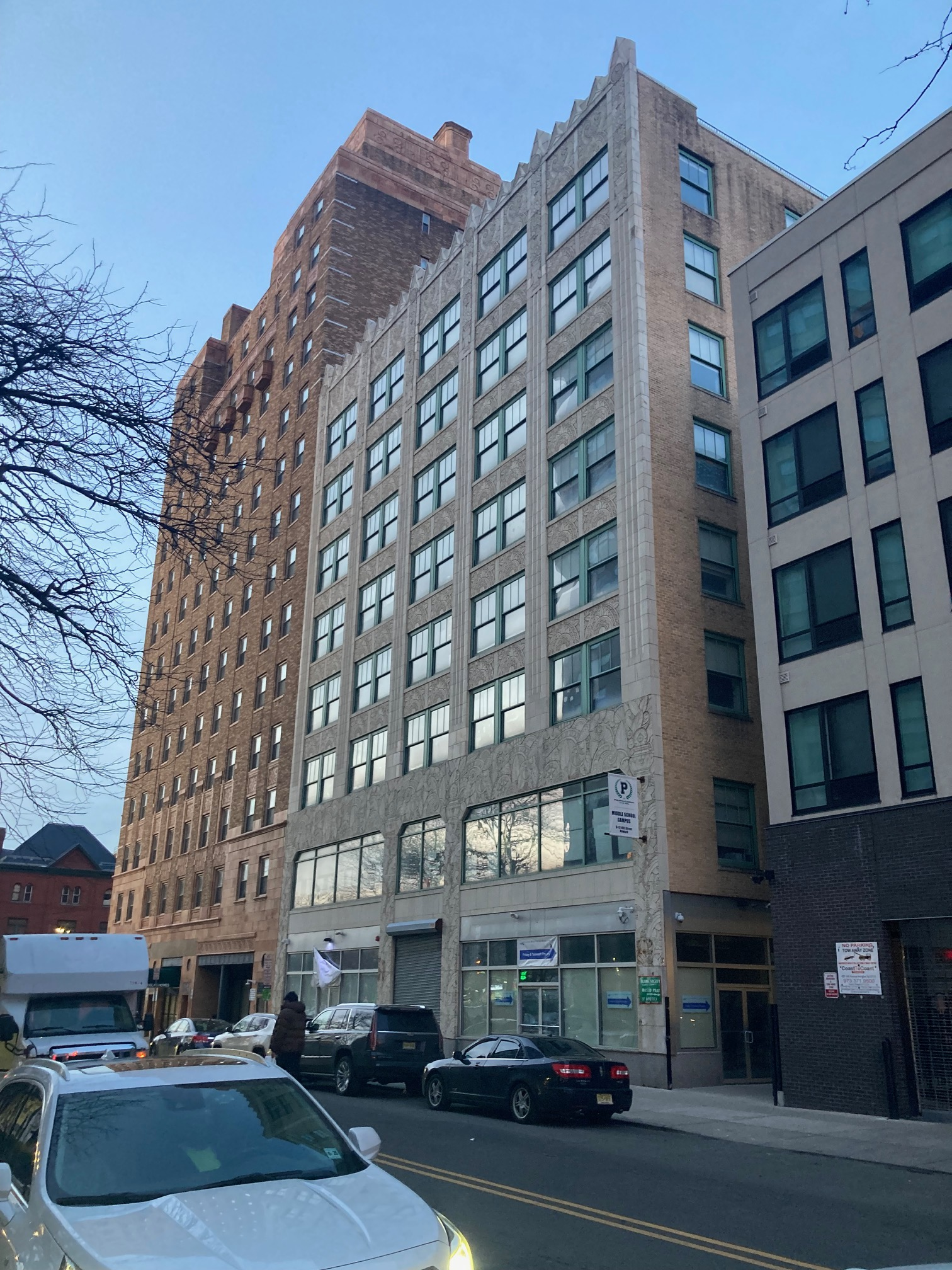
Hotel Douglas

== Trenton ==
- Maxine's (now Rio Sports Bar & Grill), Trenton, 1948
- Catholic Youth Organization (former RKO Broad Theatre), Trenton, 1920s
- Clarkson S. Fisher Federal Building and United States Courthouse, Trenton, 1932
- Daylight/Twilight Alternative High School, Trenton
- Hedgepeth–Williams Elementary School, Trenton
- Parker Elementary School, Trenton
- Paul Robeson Elementary School, Trenton
- Trenton War Memorial, Trenton, 1930
- Ulysses S. Grant Elementary School, Trenton, 1938
- Washington Elementary School, Trenton

== Other places ==
=== North Jersey ===
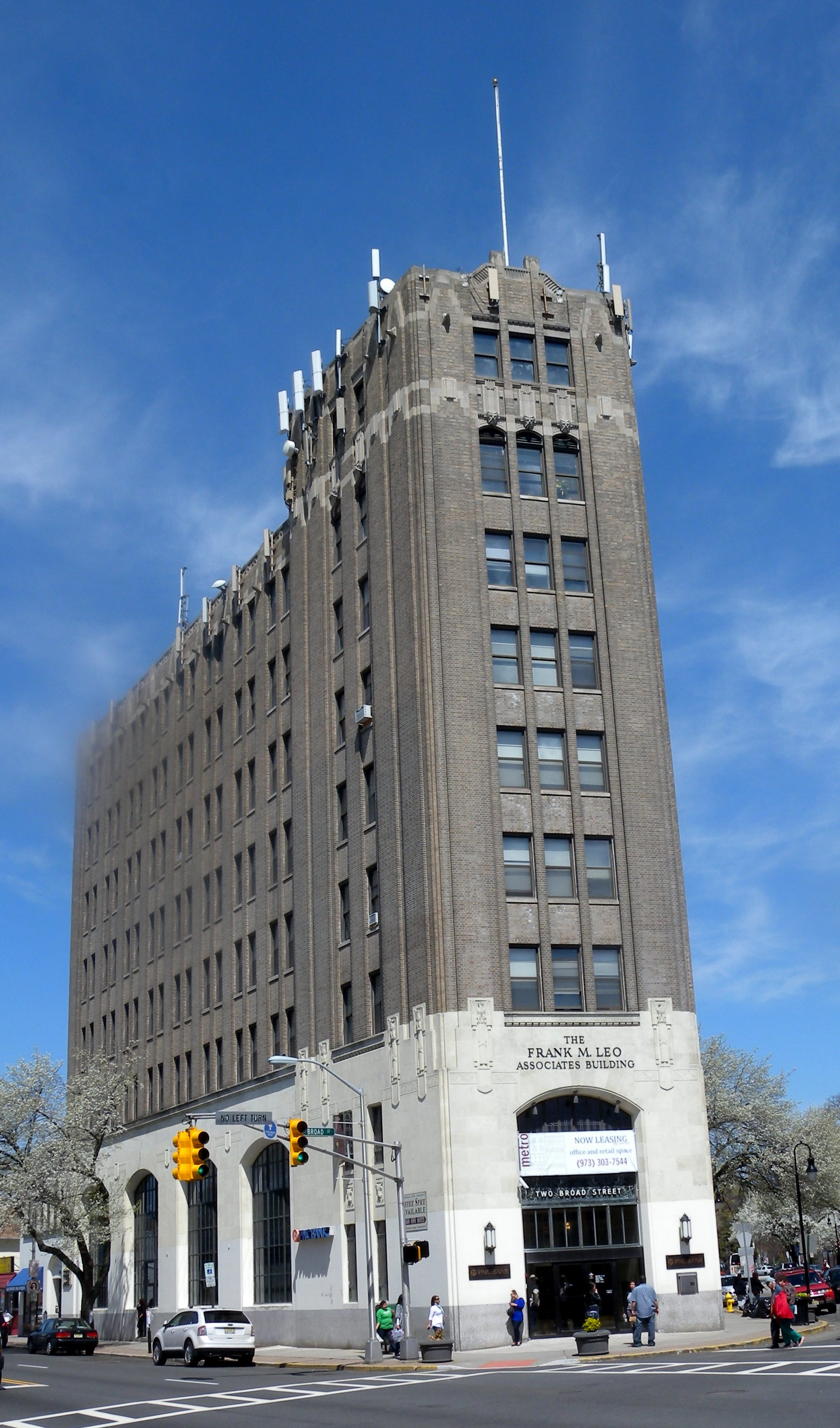
Bloomfield Trust Company

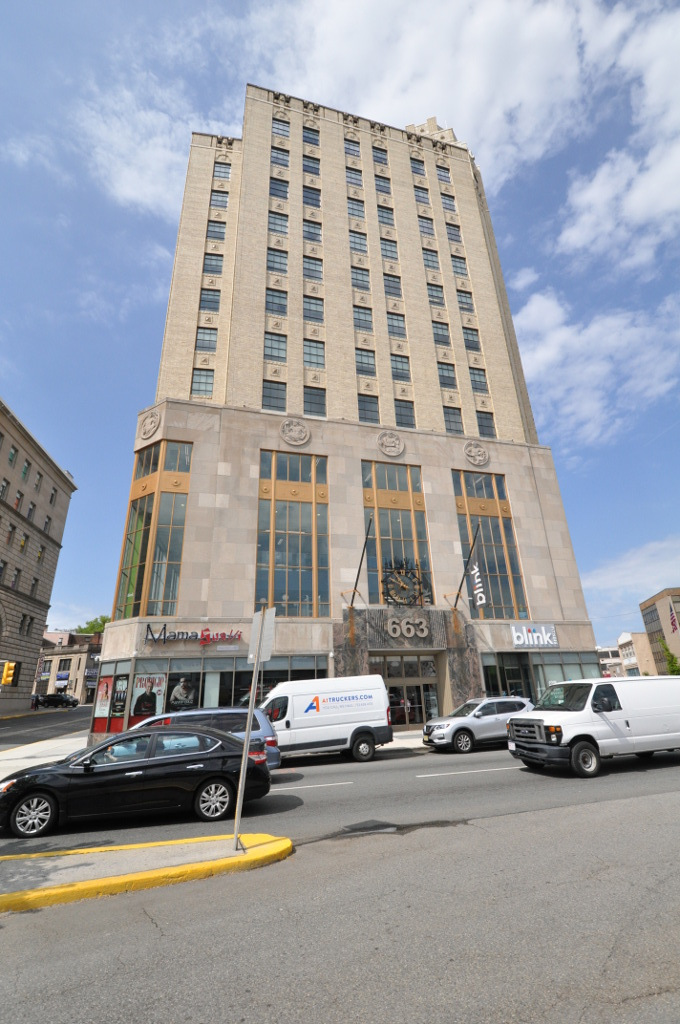
Peoples Bank and Trust

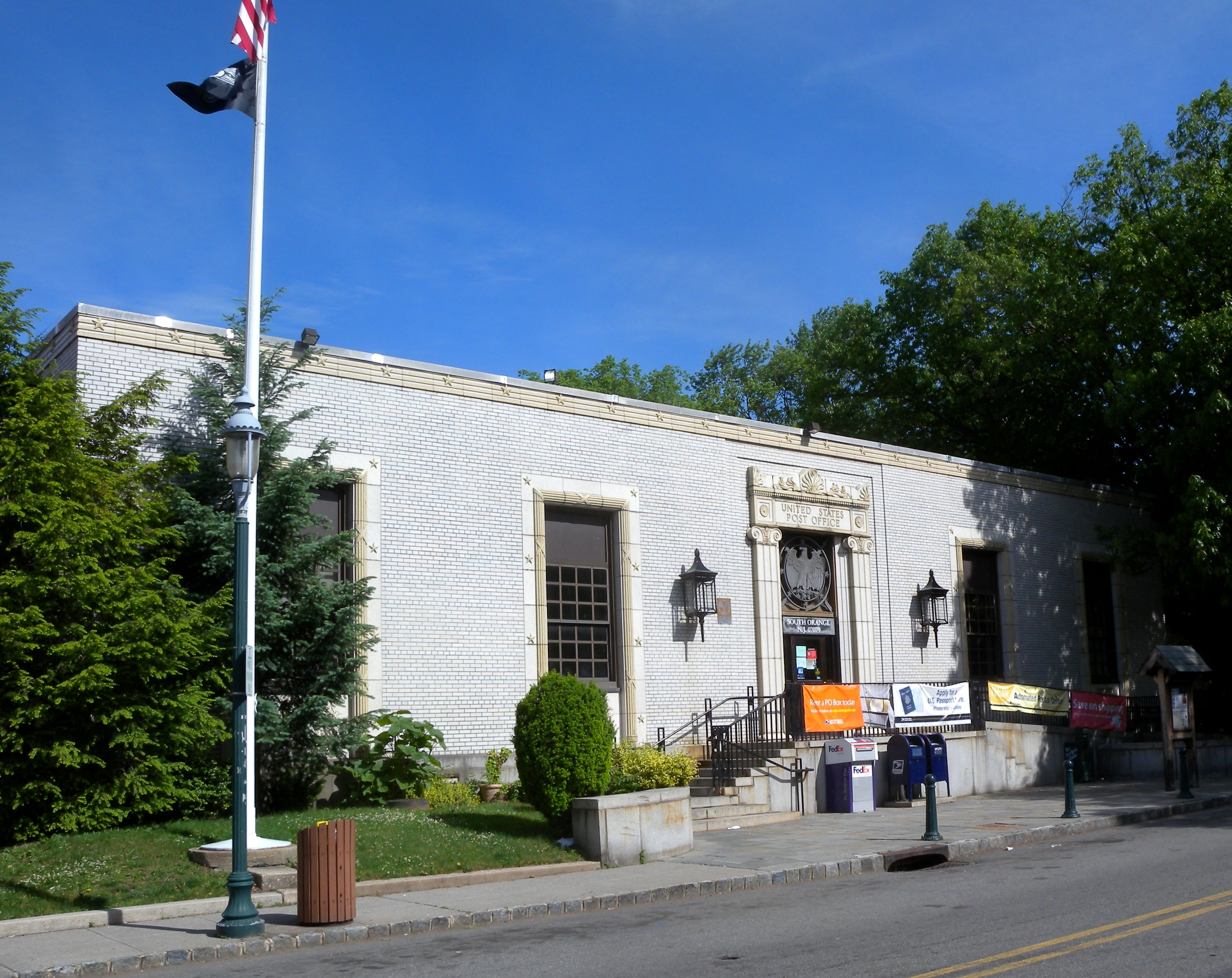
South Orange Post Office
- 225 Larch Avenue, Teaneck, 1938
- Bergen Performing Arts Center, Englewood, 1926
- Garden State Crematory, North Bergen, 1907
- Sears, Roebuck, and Company Building, Hackensack, 1930s
- Sears Roebuck (now Kennedy Center), Union City, 1932
- WMCA Transmitter Building, Kearny, 1940
- 531 Mitchell Street, Orange (now parking garage for Harvard Printing Apts.)
- People's Bank and Trust Company Building, Passaic, 1931
- Temple Emanuel, Paterson, 1929
- Belvidere Theater, Belvidere, 1930s
- Clifton Post Office, 1936
- Bloomfield Trust Company, circa 1929
- US Post Office, West New York, 1937

=== South Jersey ===
Hunts Casino Theater

- Boardwalk Hall, Atlantic City, 1929
- Gateway 26 (former Hunts Casino), Wildwood, 1940
- Hunt's Casino, Wildwood, 1940
- Ventnor Theater, Ventnor, 1922
- Landis Theatre-Mori Brothers Building, Vineland (1937)
- Hill Theatre, Paulsboro, 1938

=== Central Jersey ===
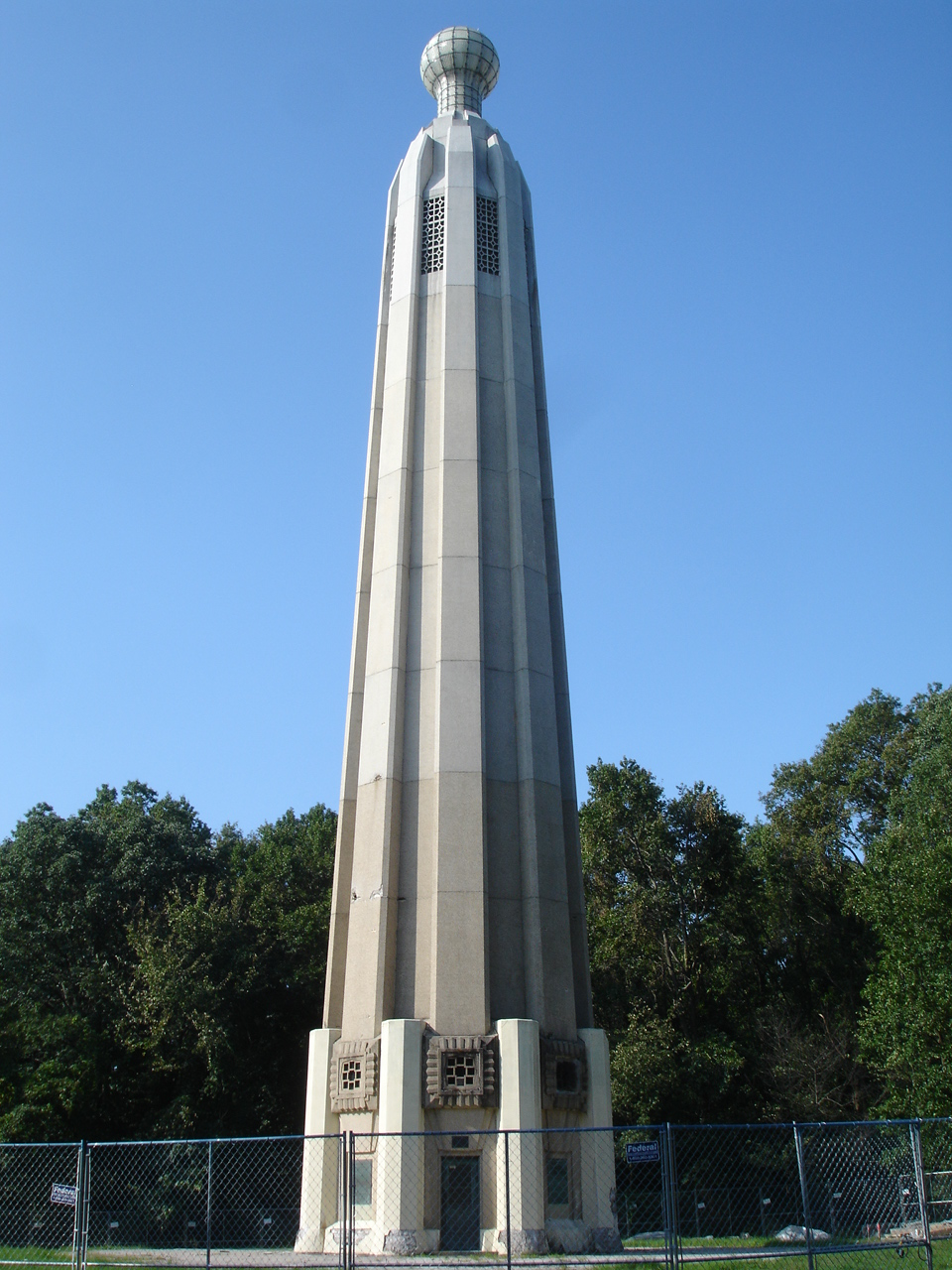
Thomas Alva Edison Memorial

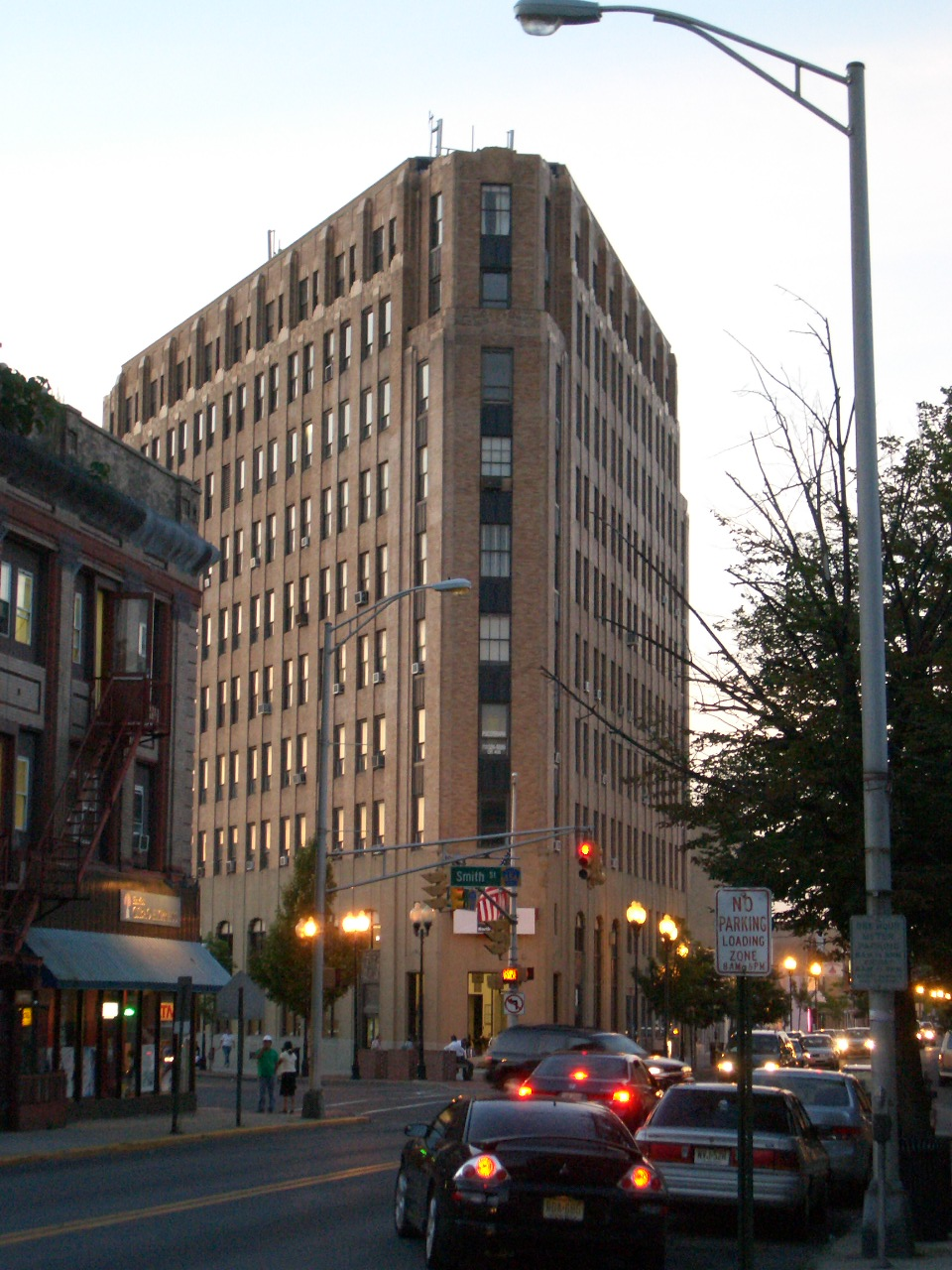
Perth Amboy Bank Building
- Perth Amboy Bank Building, Perth Amboy
- 224 Smith Street, Perth Amboy
- Jersey City Central Power, & Light Company, Keyport, 1930s
- Princeton Fire Department, Princeton Hook & Ladder Company, Princeton, 1933
- Thomas Alva Edison Memorial Tower and Museum, Edison, 1938
- Brook Arts Center, Bound Brook, 1927
- Bow-Tie Warner Theater, Ridgeway, 1932
- Lakewood Post Office, Lakewood, 1938

== Municipal buildings ==
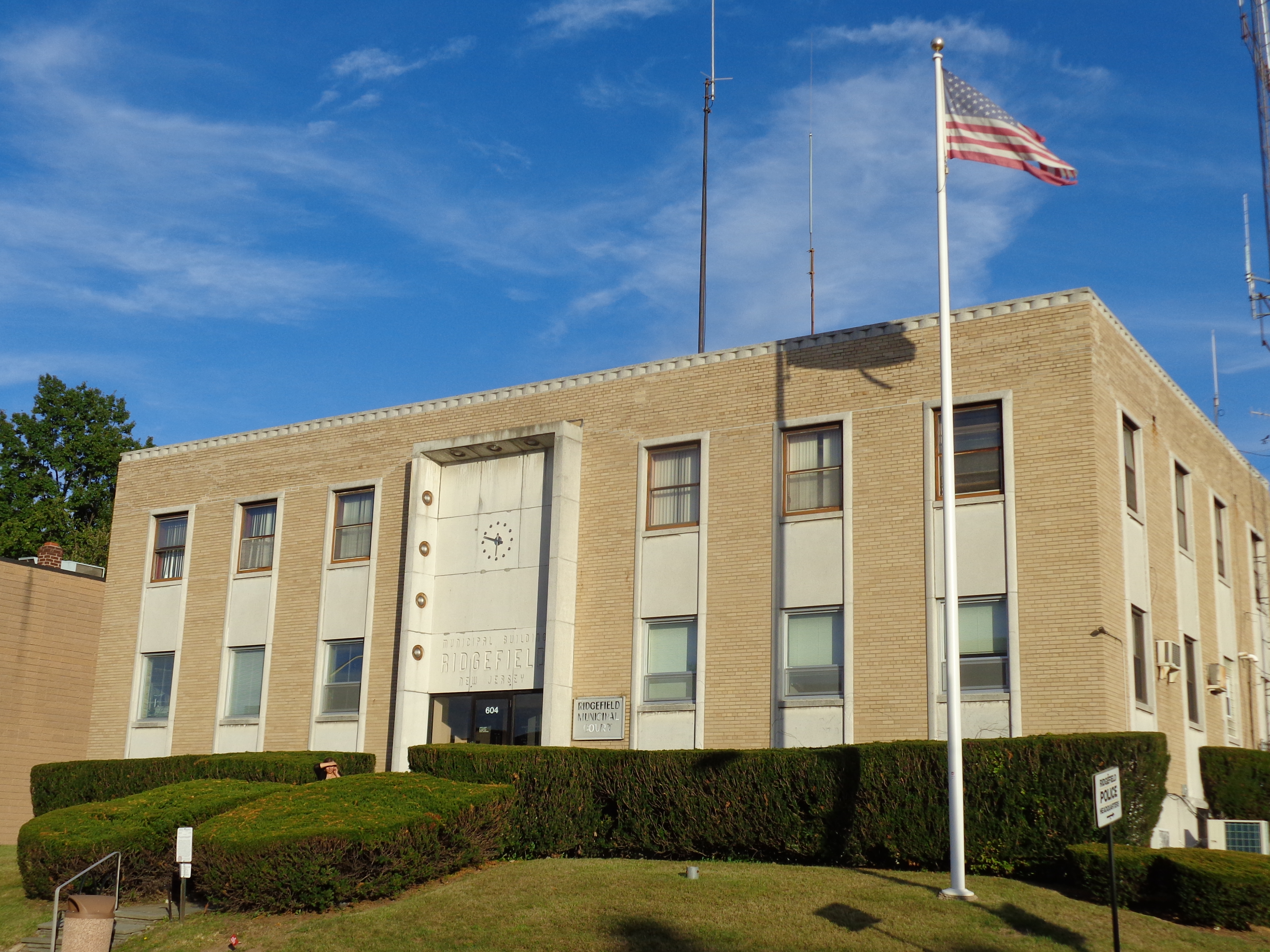
Ridgefield Borough Hall

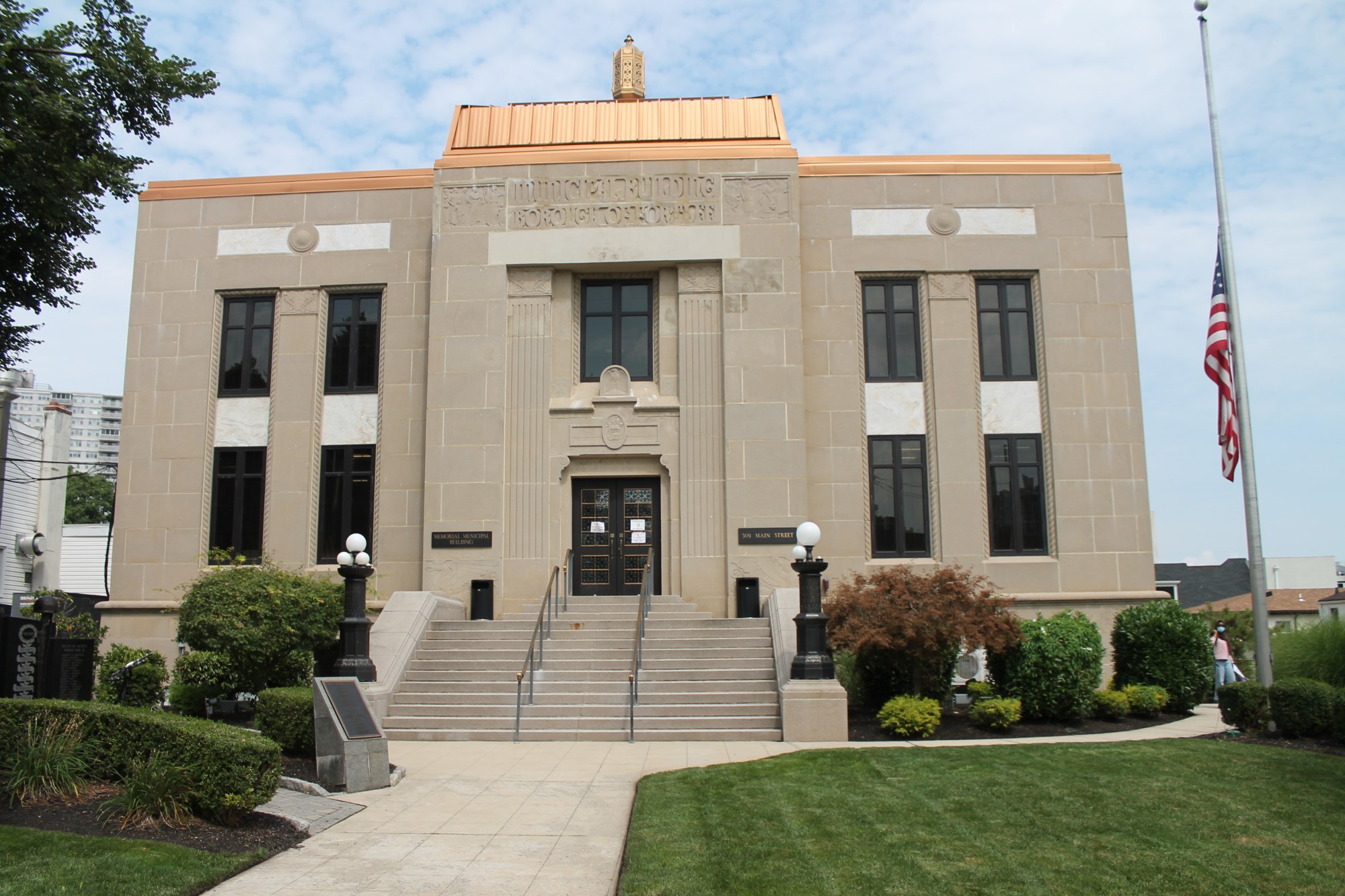
Fort Lee Borough Hall

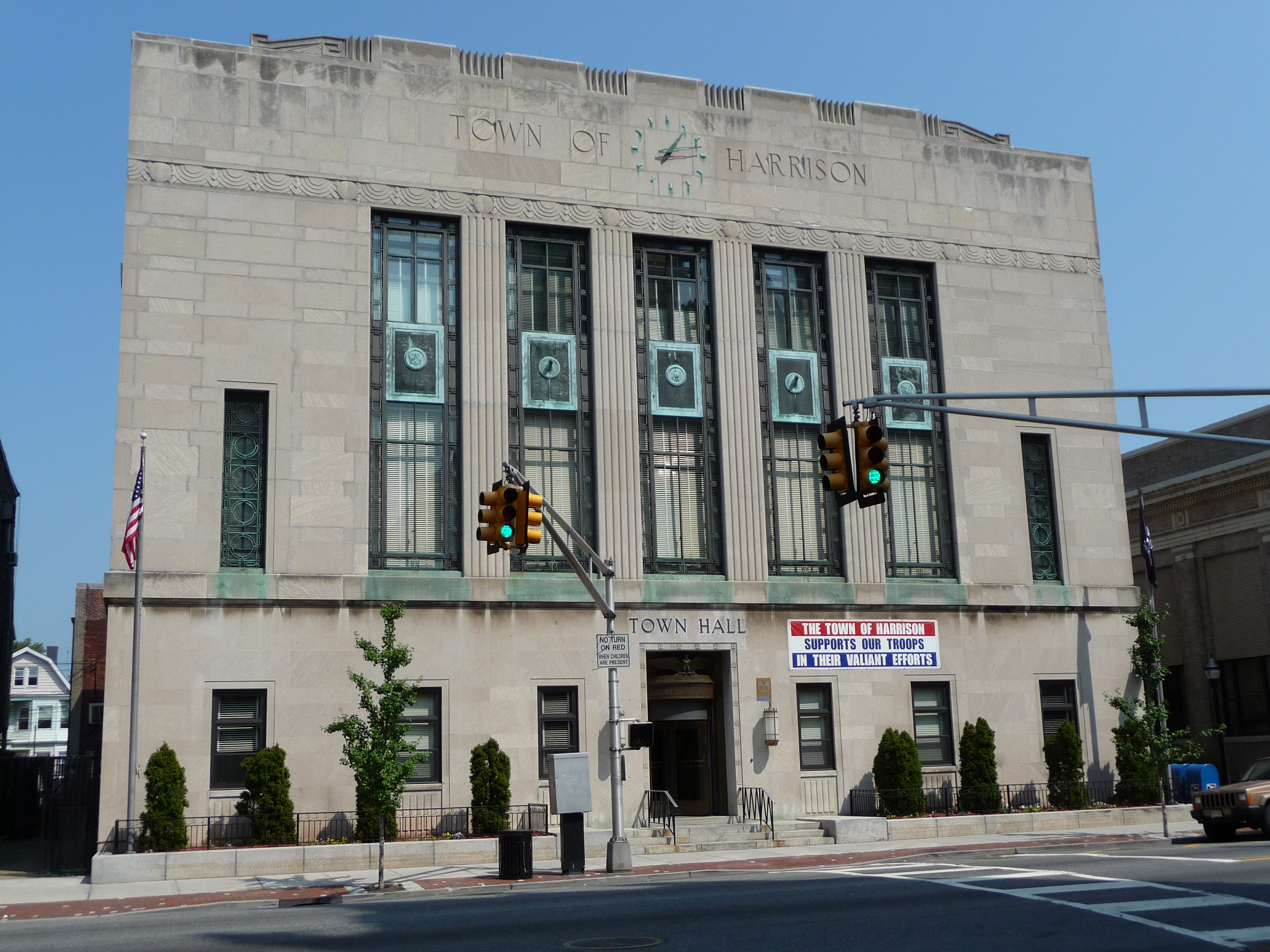
Harrison Town Hall

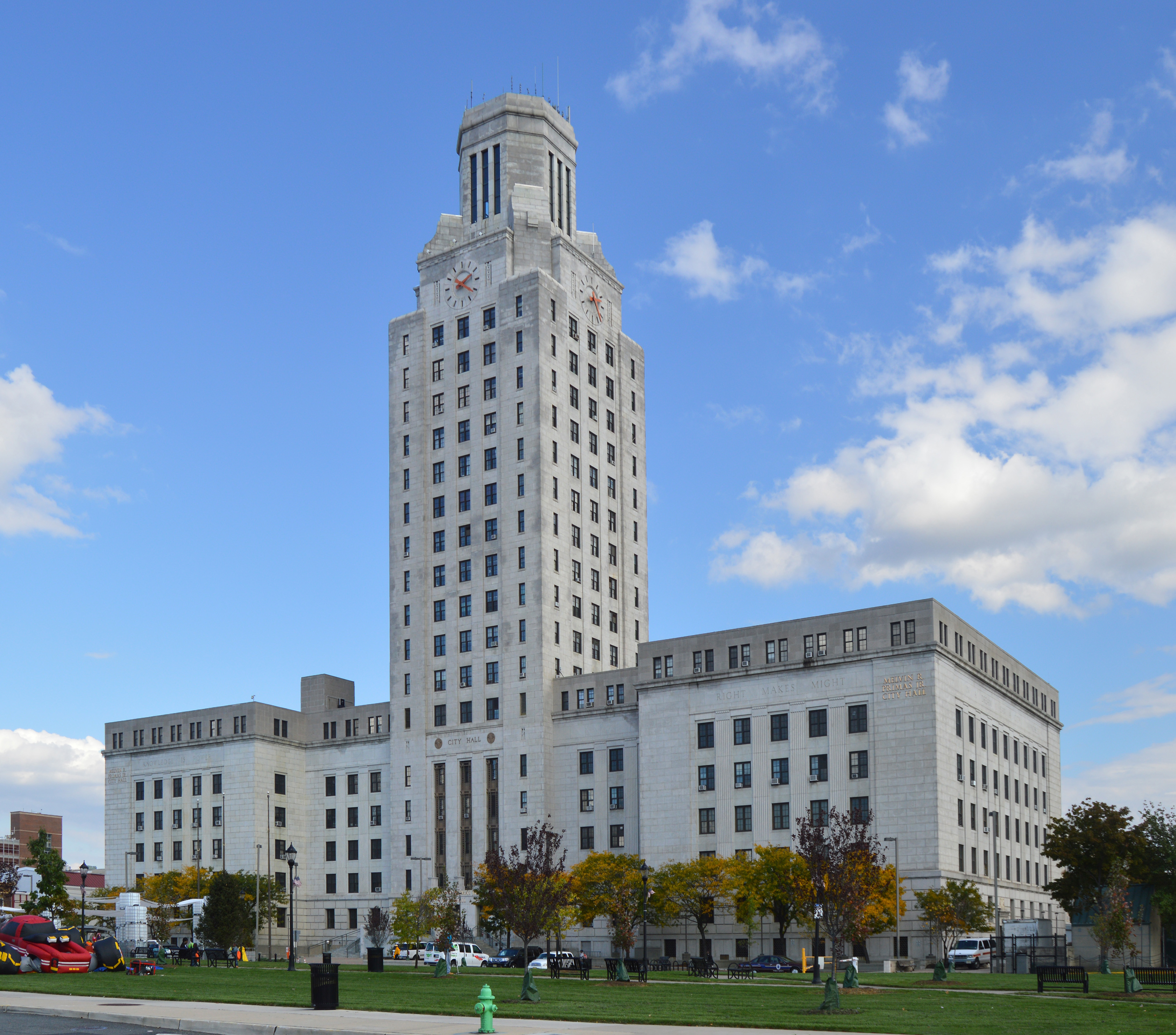
Camden City Hall

== Sears. Roebuck and Company ==
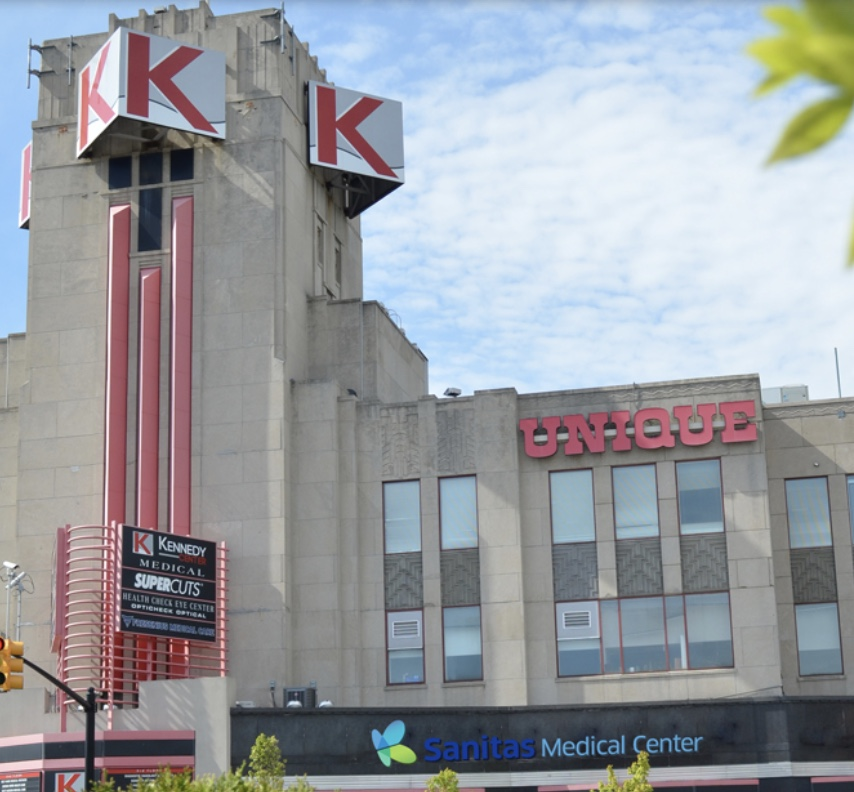
Sears Building/Kennedy Center

- Sears, Roebuck, and Company, 168 Elizabeth Avenue at Bigelow Street, Newark, opened 31 Oct. 1929
- Sears, Roebuck, and Company Building, Hackensack, 1930
- Sears Roebuck (now Kennedy Center), Union City, 1932

== Bridges and tunnels ==
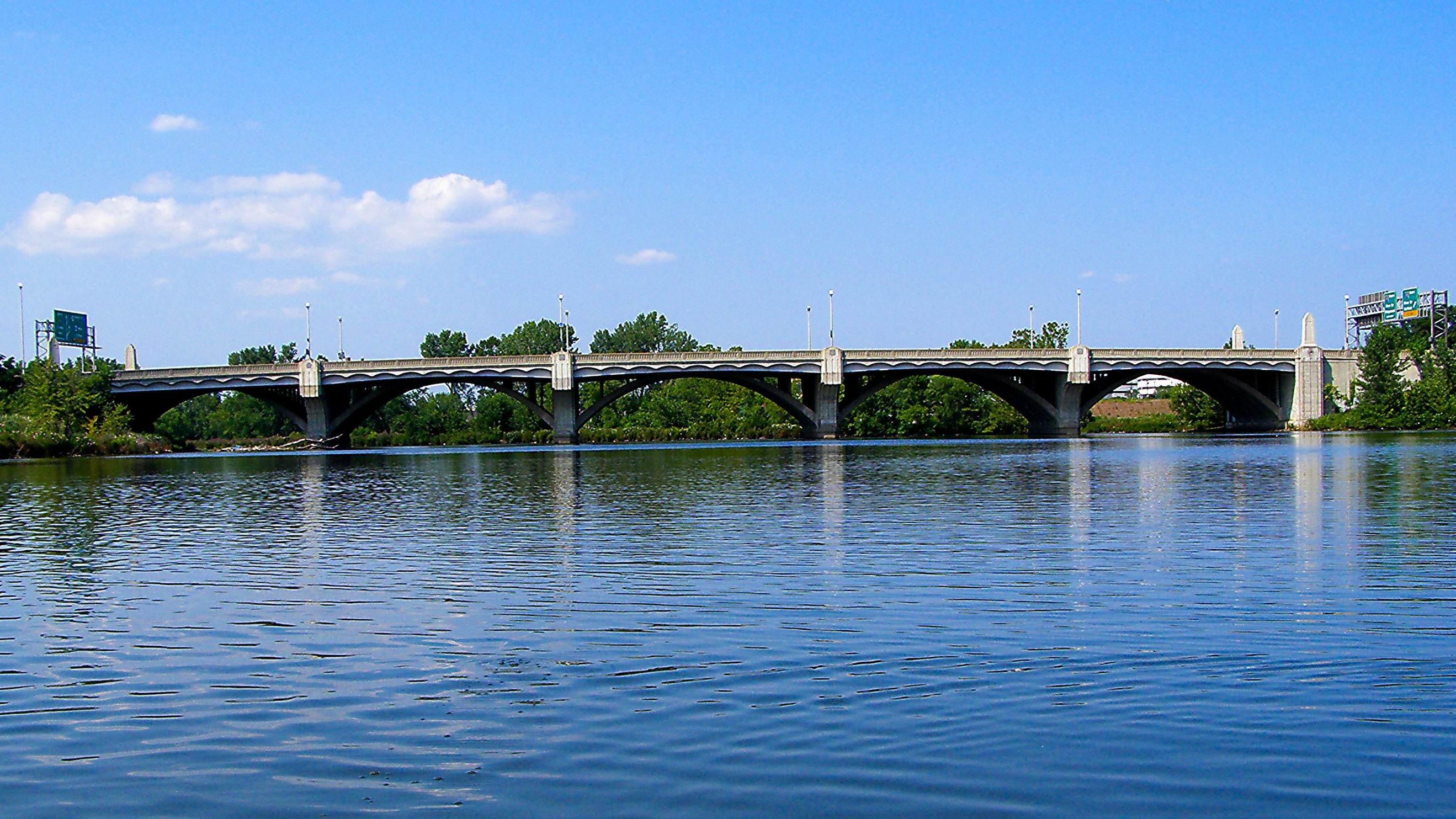
Passaic River Bridge

- Route 46 bridges over the Passaic River
- Lincoln Tunnel toll plaza and ventilation towers
- Holland Tunnel ventilation towers
- Morris Goodkind Bridge (formerly College Bridge), 1929, over Raritan River

== See also ==
- List of Art Deco architecture
- List of Art Deco architecture in the United States
