= Temple B'nai Abraham =

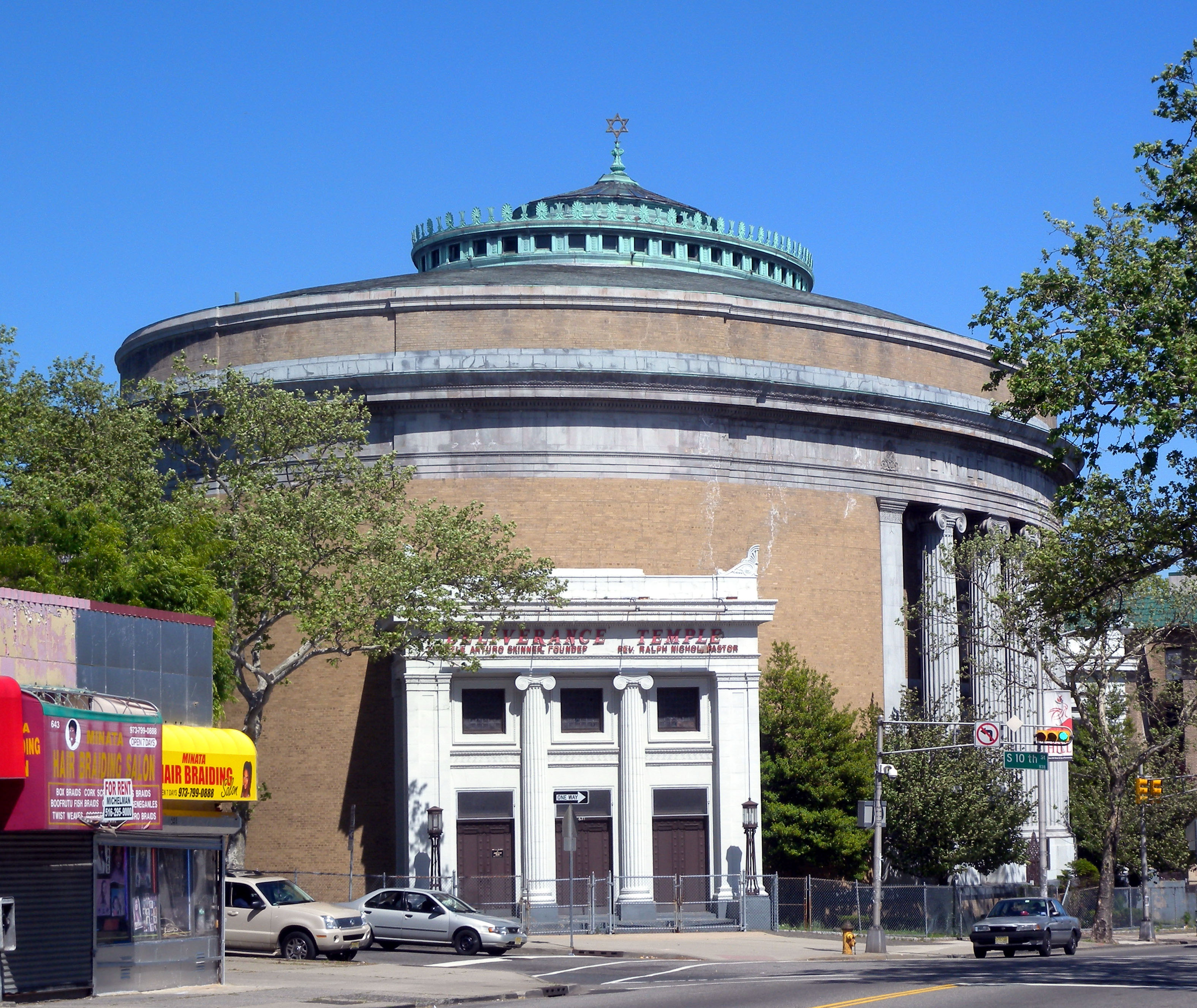

- Location of the current synagogue in Essex County, New Jersey

Religion
- Affiliation: Judaism
- Rite: Unaffiliated
- Ecclesiastical or organisational status: Synagogue
- Leadership: Rabbi David Z. Vaisberg; Rabbi Max Edwards (Associate); Rabbi Clifford M. Kulwin (Emeritus)
- Status: Active

Location
- Location: 300 East Northfield Road, Livingston, Essex County, New Jersey 07039
- Country: United States
- Coordinates: 40°46′15″N 74°18′05″W

Architecture
- Established: 1854 (as a congregation)
- Completed: 1897 (High Street, Newark); 1924 (Clinton Avenue); 1973 (Livingston)

Website
- tbanj.shulcloud.com
- Deliverence Evangelistic Center
- U.S. National Register of Historic Places
- New Jersey Register of Historic Places
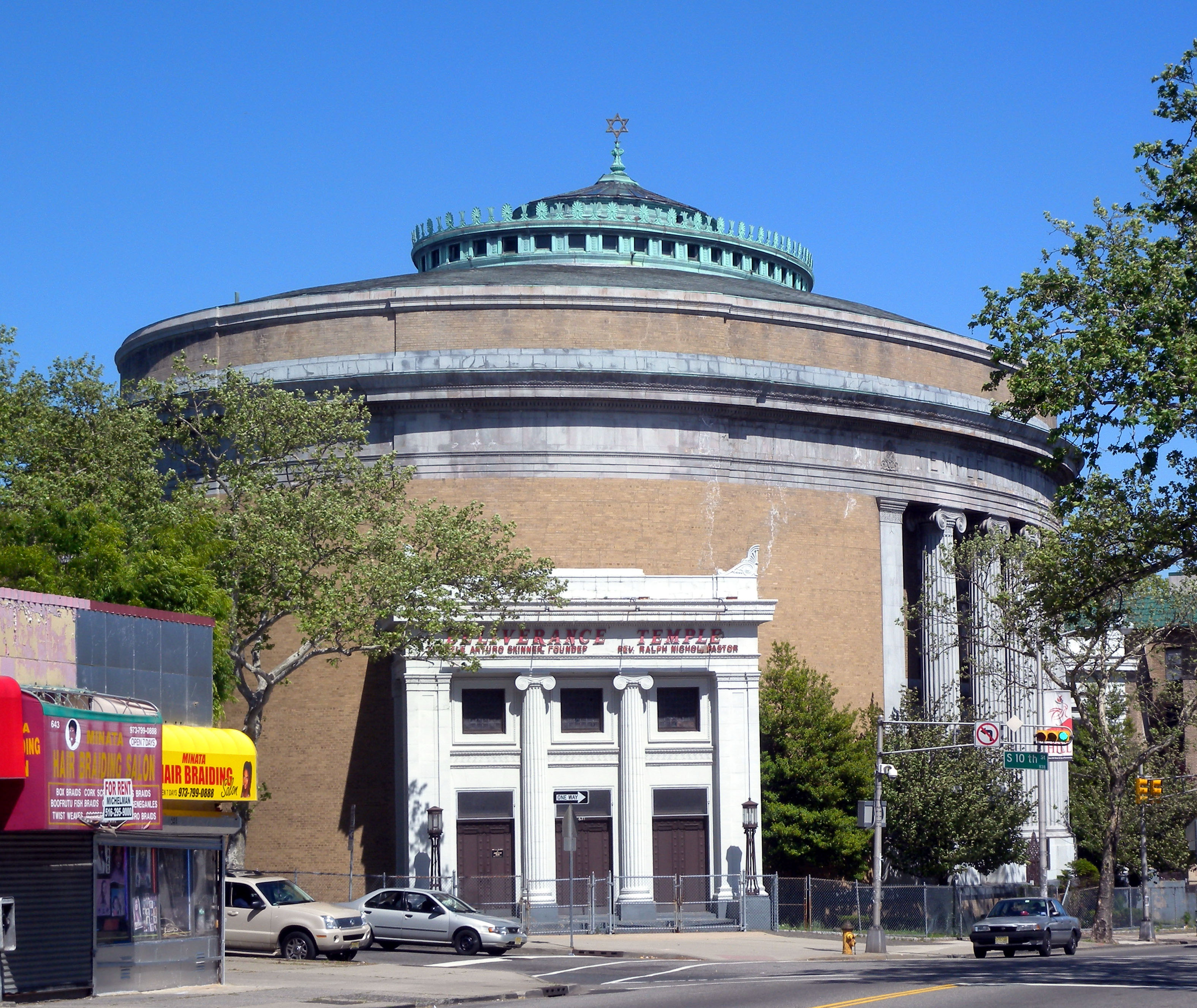
- The former synagogue, in 2010

- Location within Essex County, New Jersey Location within New Jersey Location within the United States
- Location: 621 Clinton Avenue, Newark, New Jersey
- Coordinates: 40°43′23″N 74°12′25″W
- Area: 0.5 acres (0.20 ha)
- Built: 1924
- Architect: Nathan Myers
- Architectural style: Classical Revival
- NRHP reference No.: 07000358

Significant dates
- Added to NRHP: April 26, 2007
- Designated NJRHP: April 1, 2010

Temple B'nai Abraham is an unaffiliated Jewish congregation and synagogue, located at 300 East Northfield Road, in Livingston, Essex County, New Jersey, in the United States.

Established in Newark in 1853 as an Orthodox (and later, Conservative) congregation, for most of the 20th century Temple B'nai Abraham has been independent of the organized synagogue movements, describing itself as a traditional progressive congregation.

Its historic 1924 building at 621 Clinton Avenue was used as a synagogue until 1973, and subsequently used as a Pentecostal church and, since 2023, as a charter school. The former synagogue building was listed on the National Register of Historic Places in 2007 and was added to the New Jersey Register of Historic Places in 2010.

== History ==
Temple B'nai Abraham was founded as a result of a 1853 split from Newark's first congregation, the Orthodox B'nai Jeshurun. Named in honor of Abraham Newman, most of its initial members were from Poznań, in Poland. The congregation moved often in its early years, from 25 Academy Street (1857–1866), Union Hall, 200 Market Street (1867–1869), 65 Bank Street (1870–1883), 177 Halsey Street (1884–1889), 226 Washington Street (1890–1897), and to 487 High Street (1897–1923).

The congregation engaged Nathan Myers, a Newark architect, to design its 1924 building on Clinton Avenue, completed in the Classical Revival style. Myers later designed the iconic Hersch Tower in Elizabeth, New Jersey. In addition to the sanctuary, the Clinton Avenue complex had a large number of classrooms, a gymnasium, an auditorium, and a swimming pool.

In 1973, the congregation moved to Livingston and sold the Clinton Avenue building to the Deliverance Evangelistic Center, a Pentecostal church. The former synagogue building was added to the National Register of Historic Places on April 26, 2007.

With the building in need of repairs, the struggling Deliverence Evangelistic Center sold the building to the People's Preparatory Charter School for $2.5 million in January 2023.

== Rabbinical leadership ==
Dr. Joachim Prinz, the rabbi from 1939 to 1976, modernized the ritual and introduced his own prayer book. Prinz, who had escaped Nazi Germany in 1937, was a vocal civil rights leader in the United States, known globally for his moving rhetoric. Prinz arranged for Martin Luther King Jr. to address the congregation in the Clinton Avenue building on January 17, 1963.

Prinz was succeeded by Rabbi Barry Friedman who introduced further innovations in the services and wrote and edited the prayer book, Siddur Or Chadash. In 1999, Rabbi Clifford Kulwin became the synagogue's fourth religious leader in 98 years. Rabbi David Z. Vaisberg was appointed senior rabbi in 2019.

== See also ==
- History of the Jews in New Jersey
- National Register of Historic Places listings in Essex County, New Jersey
