= Hersch Tower =

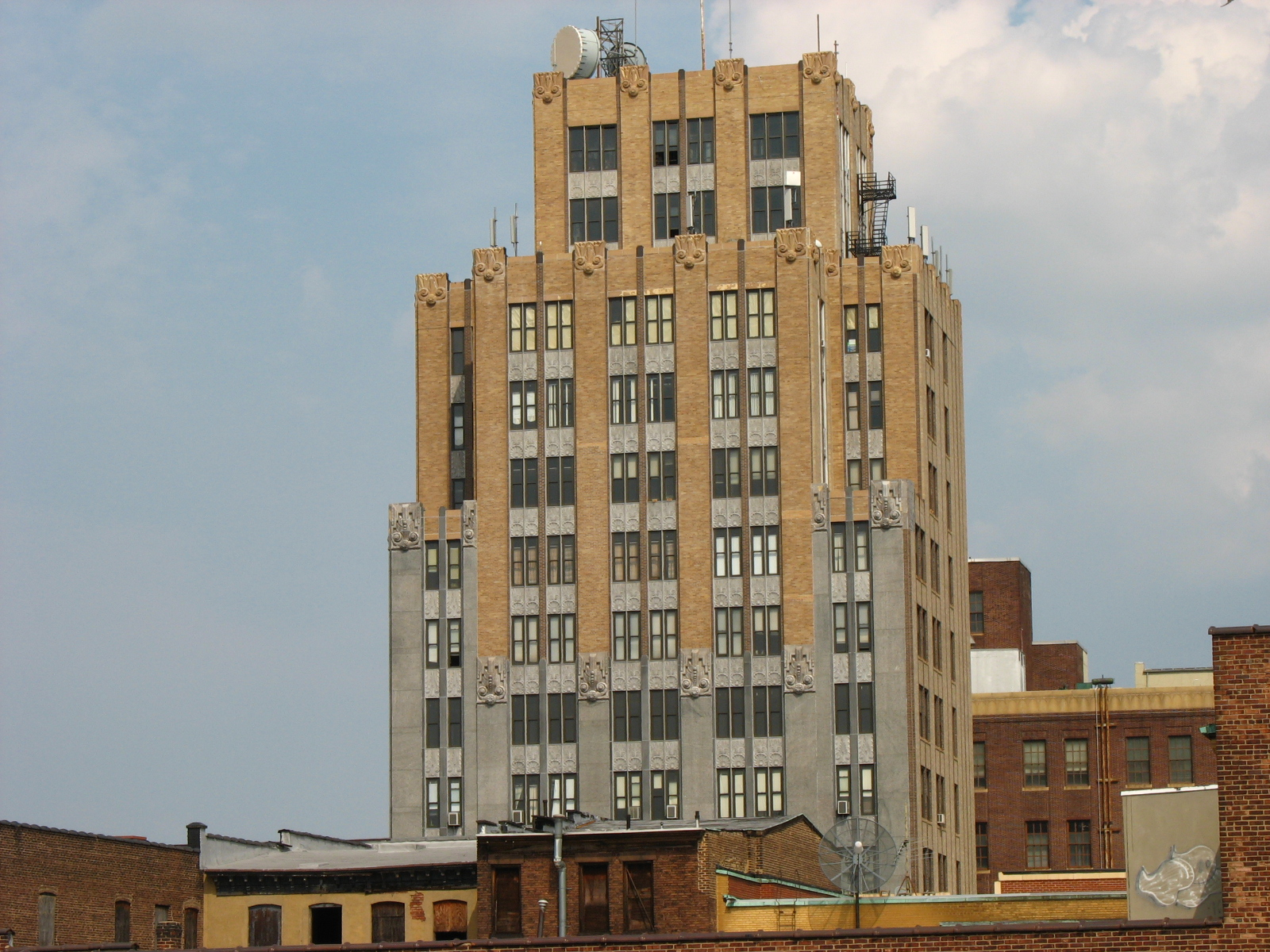
- Interactive map of the Hersch Tower area

General information
- Type: Commercial
- Location: 125 Broad Street; Elizabeth, New Jersey
- Coordinates: 40.6664915°N 74.2143118°W
- Completed: 1931
- Cost: $1,750,000

Height
- Roof: 42.67 m (140.0 ft)

Technical details
- Floor count: 14
- Lifts/elevators: 2

Design and construction
- Architect: Nathan Meyers

References
- Mid-Town Historic District
- U.S. National Register of Historic Places
- U.S. Historic district – Contributing property
- New Jersey Register of Historic Places
- Location within Union County, New Jersey Location within New Jersey Location within the United States
- NRHP reference No.: 95001143
- NJRHP No.: 2665

Significant dates
- Added to NRHP: October 5, 1995
- Designated NJRHP: September 29, 1994

Hersch Tower is a historic Art Deco building in midtown Elizabeth, New Jersey.

Constructed during the Great Depression with a façade of brick, marble and nickel in 1931 by businessman Louis Hersh, the tower is 14 stories and 42.67 m (140.0 ft) tall. The Newark architect, Nathan Myers (who had designed Temple B'Nai Abraham on Clinton Avenue in that city) and Princeton-trained Joseph Shanley designed and planned the building. It originally had self-contained vacuum system, where each unit had a wall receptacle to which one attached a vacuum hose and proceeded without additional machinery. The building also sported a fire escape system—only two of which existed in the US—in which an internal slide would pass tenants from any floor to the street swiftly in case of an emergency.

During the 1970s the building was partially renovated including replacement of the elevators and silver leaf in the lobby. It went into foreclosure and was purchased in 1990 by the Brooklyn-based Wydra brothers.

Hersch Tower is contributing property to the Mid-Town Historic District which also includes the Elizabeth Public Library and the Union County Courthouse. and other early high-rises, the Winfield Scott Tower and the Afbender Building.

In April 2018, the building received approval from the City of Elizabeth Planning Board to convert the 2nd through 11th Floors to residential dwelling units. Retail and commercial uses will occupy the ground floor and a rooftop lounge and deck is proposed on the 12th floor. The building modifications were designed by Graviano & Gillis Architects & Planners, LLC.

== See also ==
- List of tallest buildings in Elizabeth
- List of Art Deco architecture in New Jersey
- List of tallest buildings in New Jersey
