= Ridgeway, New Jersey =

Unincorporated community in New Jersey, US

- Unincorporated community
- Location within Ocean County, New Jersey Location within New Jersey Location within the United States
- Coordinates: 40°01′53″N 74°17′03″W
- Country: United States
- State: New Jersey
- County: Ocean
- Township: Manchester
- Elevation: 66 ft (20 m)
- Time zone: UTC−05:00 (Eastern (EST))
  - Summer (DST): UTC−04:00 (EDT)
- GNIS feature ID: 879687

Ridgeway is an unincorporated community located within Manchester Township, in Ocean County, in the U.S. state of New Jersey.

Ridgeway is located approximately two miles (3.2 km) northeast of Lakehurst, on the north bank of the Ridgeway Branch.

A station of the New Jersey Southern Railroad was located in Ridgeway as early as 1876.
