= The NFL on NBC pregame show =

NBC's NFL pre-game coverage throughout history

The NBC television network's in-studio pre-game coverage for their National Football League game telecasts has been presented under various titles and formats throughout NBC's NFL coverage history.

== History ==
=== GrandStand (1975–1976) ===
NBC's first official NFL pre-game show was GrandStand, a program that doubled as a competing sports anthology series to ABC's Wide World of Sports during the off-season (GrandStand also served as the pre-game show for NBC's Major League Baseball Game of the Week during the 1976 season). GrandStand premiered in 1975 with hosts Jack Buck and Bryant Gumbel (who joined Buck sometime later in the season). Prior to 1975, NBC aired the political talk show Meet the Press in the NFL pre-game show's timeslot (12:30 p.m. Eastern) against The NFL Today, the pre-game show of CBS since 1967.

In 1976, Jack Buck left GrandStand in order to return to the booth as a play-by-play announcer, remaining with NBC. He was replaced as co-host by Lee Leonard.

Leonard (who would later become a co-host of ESPN's SportsCenter) left the program in 1977, and was replaced by Mike Adamle and Regina Haskins as Gumbel's co-hosts. For the post-game show, GrandStand kept the Sperry NFL Report, although later incarnations of the post-game would be retitled the Budweiser NFL Report.

=== NFL (1977–1986) ===
In 1977, NBC dropped the GrandStand moniker in favor of NFL, which the title being paired with a year number that corresponded to the then-current NFL season (such as NFL '77 and NFL '78). Beginning with NFL '80, NBC would pioneer the use of in-game highlight packages ("Let's go to New York for an NFL '80 update") NBC would use this particular method of titling their pregame show until the 1987 season.

Bryant Gumbel hosted the NFL on NBC pregame show through the 1981 season, when he left NBC Sports to become co-anchor of NBC's morning program Today. In his final two seasons on The NFL on NBC, Gumbel served as the sole host for the pre-game show. Gumbel was subsequently replaced by Len Berman, who was joined by Adamle, Pete Axthelm (who left following the 1985 season) and Ahmad Rashad.

For Berman's second season (and what turned out to be his final full season) as host, Bill Macatee (who left following the 1984 season) and Dave Marash (who left following the 1983 season) replaced Adamle and Rashad. Rashad would return to the pre-game show in 1984 and continue onward through the 1988 season.

In October 1984, NBC was also covering the World Series between the Detroit Tigers and San Diego Padres. Even though Game 5 was on a Sunday afternoon (Game 5 was at 4:30 p.m. ET), Bob Costas (who anchored NBC's World Series coverage with Len Berman) was still in New York City to host NFL '84. At the end of the pre-game show, Costas left the New York studio to travel to Detroit to cover that night's baseball game at Tiger Stadium. In the meantime, Macatee filled-in for Costas, providing updates and halftime highlights. Costas later interviewed the Tigers in their locker room that night.

In 1985, NBC moved its Sunday pre-game show to 12:30 p.m. Eastern Time no matter what time that market got a game. CBS followed suit in 1986. Previously, NBC and CBS would air their pre-game shows at 1:30 and 3:30 p.m. Eastern Time for markets that were only receiving games with 2:00 or 4:00 p.m. Eastern start times.

From the mid-to-late 1980s, NBC would to open its NFL pre-game show with a feature called "Great Games, Great Moments," which rebroadcast an original clip (from an NBC telecast, as opposed to NFL Films) of a play from a classic NFL game originally televised on the network. The instrumental music that NBC used for the "Great Games, Great Moments" clip was "Constant Energy" by Craig Palmer. During the 1986 season, NBC experimented with using a studio audience for its NFL '86 telecasts; this would be dropped after that season. Paul Maguire served as an analyst from 1986 to 1987, alongside Costas and Rashad.

=== NFL Live! (1987–1994) ===
==== 1987–1988 ====
In 1987, the network's pre-game show was retitled NFL Live! (a title that would later be used by ESPN for the NFL analysis program previously titled NFL 2Night – although without the exclamation point – in 2003, six years after NBC lost the broadcast rights to the league's American Football Conference to CBS). Gayle Gardner would join the team as an analyst in 1988, alongside Costas and Rashad. Also in 1988, Costas' predecessor, Len Berman temporarily returned as the program's host as Costas was covering that year's Summer Olympics in Seoul for NBC. Gayle Sierens, who made history as the first female play-by-play announcer in NFL history one year earlier, would join Berman while Costas, Rashad and Gardner were in Seoul. Paul Maguire also briefly returned to NFL Live! (he had earlier left the program to become a color commentator for NBC) during the Olympics period.

==== 1989–1993 ====
For the 1989 season, O. J. Simpson became an analyst for NFL Live! alongside Costas; Simpson remained on the program until the end of the 1993 season. (Simpson was arrested on two counts of murder on June 17, 1994, and remained incarcerated until his acquittal on October 3, 1995.) That year, the program introduced the John Tesh-composed theme "Gridiron Dreams". In 1990, Will McDonough moved over from CBS' The NFL Today to join NFL Live! He would leave the program after the 1993 season to serve as a sideline reporter and host of the program's "News and Notes" segment. In 1991, Bill Parcells (who left after just one season for a role as an in-booth analyst for NBC) joined the team.

For Week 1 of the 1991 season, Marv Albert substituted as host of NFL Live!. Regular host Bob Costas along with O. J. Simpson, play-by-play broadcaster Tom Hammond and analyst Todd Christensen were assigned to cover the world track and field championships in Tokyo, Japan.

Bob Costas held the main hosting position through the 1992 season, but would continue his involvement with The NFL on NBC, albeit in a more limited role such as delivering pre-taped, one-on-one interviews. Jim Lampley replaced Costas as the host of NFL Live! in 1993, before leaving the program in favor of becoming a play-by-play announcer for NBC's NFL telecasts.

Mike Ditka also joined NFL Live! as a regular commentator that year. For the 1993 season, "Gridiron Dreams" was replaced as the program's theme music by a composition composed by John Colby.

==== 1994–1997 ====
From 1994 to 1997, former NFL Today host Greg Gumbel served as the program's host, alongside Ahmad Rashad. Meanwhile, a revamped version of John Colby's theme music was used solely for that season. That year, Joe Gibbs joined NFL Live! as an analyst, staying on through the 1997 season. In 1994 and 1995, NBC ran an hour-long edition of the pre-game show before Week 1. Ditka left the program after the 1996 season.

=== The NFL on NBC (1995–1997) ===
During NBC's last three years as the broadcast television home of the American Football Conference (from the 1995 to 1997 seasons), the pregame show was simply titled The NFL on NBC. The theme music by Randy Edelman was used for both the pregame show and the network's game coverage.

In 1995, Joe Montana joined the program as an analyst, but left after just one season. Montana was subsequently replaced by Cris Collinsworth, who stayed on through the 1997 season. As previously mentioned, Mike Ditka left NBC following the 1996 season to become the head coach of the New Orleans Saints and was replaced by Sam Wyche.

=== Football Night in America (2006–present) ===
After NBC won the rights to the Sunday Night Football package from ESPN, effective with the 2006 season, NBC launched the 80-minute pre-game Football Night in America, the only prime time pre-game show on a major broadcast network. The program was initially hosted by Bob Costas.

== On-air staff ==
Season	Studio host	Studio analysts of The NFL on NBC Pregame Show
1975	Jack Buck	Bryant Gumbel
1976	Lee Leonard	Bryant Gumbel
1977	Lee Leonard	Bryant Gumbel
1978	Bryant Gumbel	Mike Adamle
1979	Bryant Gumbel	Mike Adamle
1980	Bryant Gumbel	Mike Adamle
1981	Bryant Gumbel	Mike Adamle
1982	Len Berman	Pete Axthelm; Ahmad Rashad
1983	Len Berman	Pete Axthelm; Bill Macatee; Dave Marash
1984	Bob Costas	Pete Axthelm; Dave Marash; Ahmad Rashad
1985	Bob Costas	Pete Axthelm; Ahmad Rashad; Larry King
1986	Bob Costas	Paul Maguire; Ahmad Rashad
1987	Bob Costas	Paul Maguire; Ahmad Rashad
1988	Bob Costas	Paul Maguire; Gayle Gardner; Len Berman; Jim Gray; Gayle Sierens
1989	Bob Costas	O. J. Simpson
1990	Bob Costas	O. J. Simpson; Will McDonough
1991	Bob Costas	O. J. Simpson; Will McDonough; Bill Parcells
1992	Bob Costas	O. J. Simpson; Will McDonough; Buddy Ryan
1993	Jim Lampley	Mike Ditka; Will McDonough
1994	Greg Gumbel; Ahmad Rashad	Mike Ditka; Joe Gibbs
1995	Greg Gumbel; Ahmad Rashad	Mike Ditka; Joe Gibbs; Joe Montana
1996	Greg Gumbel; Ahmad Rashad	Cris Collinsworth; Mike Ditka; Joe Gibbs
1997	Greg Gumbel; Ahmad Rashad	Cris Collinsworth; Sam Wyche; Joe Gibbs
1998	No program	
1999	No program	
2000	No program	
2001	No program	
2002	No program	
2003	No program	
2004	No program	
2005	No program	
2006	Bob Costas	Cris Collinsworth; Jerome Bettis; Sterling Sharpe; Peter King
2007	Bob Costas; Keith Olbermann	Cris Collinsworth; Jerome Bettis; Tiki Barber; Peter King
2008	Bob Costas; Dan Patrick; Keith Olbermann	Cris Collinsworth; Jerome Bettis; Tiki Barber; Peter King
2009	Bob Costas (On-site); Dan Patrick and Keith Olbermann (Studio)	Tony Dungy; Rodney Harrison; Peter King
2010	Bob Costas (On-site); Dan Patrick (Studio)	Tony Dungy; Rodney Harrison; Peter King
2011	Bob Costas (On-site); Dan Patrick (Studio)	Tony Dungy; Rodney Harrison; Peter King
2012	Bob Costas (On-site); Dan Patrick (Studio)	Tony Dungy, Rodney Harrison, Peter King and Mike Florio (Studio); Hines Ward (On-site)
2013	Bob Costas (On-site); Dan Patrick (Studio)	Tony Dungy, Rodney Harrison, Peter King and Mike Florio (Studio); Hines Ward (On-site)
2014	Bob Costas (On-site); Dan Patrick (Studio)	Tony Dungy, Rodney Harrison, Peter King and Mike Florio (Studio); Hines Ward (On-site)
2015	Bob Costas (On-site); Dan Patrick (Studio)	Tony Dungy, Rodney Harrison, Peter King and Mike Florio (Studio); Hines Ward (On-site)
2016	Mike Tirico (On-site); Dan Patrick (Studio) (Sundays); Bob Costas (Thursdays)	Tony Dungy; Rodney Harrison; Peter King; Mike Florio
2017	Mike Tirico (On-site); Dan Patrick (Studio) (Sundays); Liam McHugh (Thursdays)	Tony Dungy; Rodney Harrison; Chris Simms; Mike Florio
2018	Mike Tirico (Studio); Liam McHugh (On-site)	Tony Dungy; Rodney Harrison; Chris Simms; Mike Florio
2019	Mike Tirico (Studio); Liam McHugh (On-site)	Tony Dungy; Rodney Harrison; Chris Simms; Mike Florio
2020	Mike Tirico (Studio); Liam McHugh (On-site)	Tony Dungy; Rodney Harrison; Chris Simms; Mike Florio
2021	Mike Tirico and Maria Taylor (Studio); Jac Collinsworth (On-site)	Tony Dungy, Drew Brees, Chris Simms and Mike Florio (Studio); Rodney Harrison (On-site)
2022	Maria Taylor (Studio); Jac Collinsworth (On-site)	Tony Dungy, Jason Garrett, Chris Simms and Mike Florio (Studio); Rodney Harrison (On-site)
2023	Maria Taylor and Ahmed Fareed (Studio); Jac Collinsworth (On-site)	Devin McCourty, Jason Garrett, Chris Simms and Mike Florio (Studio); Tony Dungy and Rodney Harrison (On-site)
2024	Maria Taylor (Studio); Jac Collinsworth (On-site)	Devin McCourty, Jason Garrett, Chris Simms and Mike Florio (Studio); Tony Dungy and Rodney Harrison (On-site)
2025	Maria Taylor (Studio); Jac Collinsworth (On-site)	Devin McCourty, Jason Garrett, Chris Simms and Mike Florio (Studio); Tony Dungy and Rodney Harrison (On-site)
2026	Maria Taylor	Devin McCourty; Jason Garrett; Mike Tomlin; Mike Florio

== See also ==
- The NFL Today
- Fox NFL Sunday
- Sunday NFL Countdown
