= Deflategate =

2015 NFL scandal

Deflategate scandal
- Date: January 18, 2015
- Duration: January 18, 2015–October 9, 2016
- Venue: NFL
- Participants: Tom Brady, Bill Belichick, Roger Goodell, NFL officials, referees, and equipment staff
- Outcome: $1 million fine for the New England Patriots, a 4–game suspension for Patriots quarterback Tom Brady, docked draft selections, rule changes

The Deflategate scandal was a National Football League (NFL) controversy in the United States involving the allegation that New England Patriots quarterback Tom Brady ordered the deliberate deflation of footballs that were used in the Patriots' victory against the Indianapolis Colts during the 2014 AFC Championship Game on January 18, 2015. The controversy resulted in Brady being suspended for the first four games of the 2016 NFL season, while the Patriots were fined $1 million and forfeited two draft selections in 2016.

For his alleged part in the scandal, Brady's suspension was originally to be implemented during the 2015 regular season. Brady successfully appealed the suspension in the U.S. District Court for the Southern District of New York, allowing him to resume his playing duties for the entirety of 2015. However, following the conclusion of the season, the U.S. Court of Appeals for the Second Circuit reinstated Brady's four-game suspension, which became effective for the 2016 regular season. After losing a request for a rehearing, Brady announced he would accept the suspension and missed the season's first four games. Brady was later reinstated as the Patriots' starting quarterback on October 9, 2016, versus the Cleveland Browns, concluding the events of Deflategate. The controversy remained a topic of discussion during the season, which concluded with the Patriots winning Super Bowl LI and Brady being named the Most Valuable Player (MVP) of the game. The season also saw the NFL change the procedure for monitoring football pressure, conducting air pressure spot-checks during halftime of games.

In February 2022, it was revealed by sportswriter Mike Florio that the NFL deleted data from 2015 regular season football air-pressure spot-checks that showed similar deflation of balls at halftime in similar weather conditions on orders from NFL general counsel Jeff Pash.

== Background ==
The official rules of the National Football League require footballs to be inflated to a gauge pressure of between 12.5 and 13.5 pounds per square inch (86 and 93 kPa) when measured by the game officials. The rules do not specify the temperature at which such measurement is to be made. As stated by the pressure-temperature law, there is a positive correlation between the temperature and pressure of a gas with a fixed volume and mass. Thus, if a football were inflated to the minimum pressure of 12.5 psi at room temperature, the pressure would drop below the minimum as the gases inside cooled to a lower ambient temperature on the playing field.

Before 2006, normal NFL operating procedure was for the home team to provide all of the game's footballs. In 2006, the rules were altered so that each team uses its own footballs while on offense. Teams rarely handle a football used by the other team except after recovering a fumble or interception. Brady, along with Peyton Manning, who started at quarterback for the Indianapolis Colts in 2006, argued for the rules to change for the express purpose of letting quarterbacks use footballs that suited them. Removing air from a football makes it easier to grip, throw, and catch.

Early reports suggested that the Colts and Baltimore Ravens first suspected that the footballs the Patriots were using in the games against each team might have been deliberately underinflated to gain an illegal advantage during the 2014 NFL regular season, although Baltimore head coach John Harbaugh denied reports concerning the Ravens.

== AFC Championship Game ==
2014 AFC Championship Game
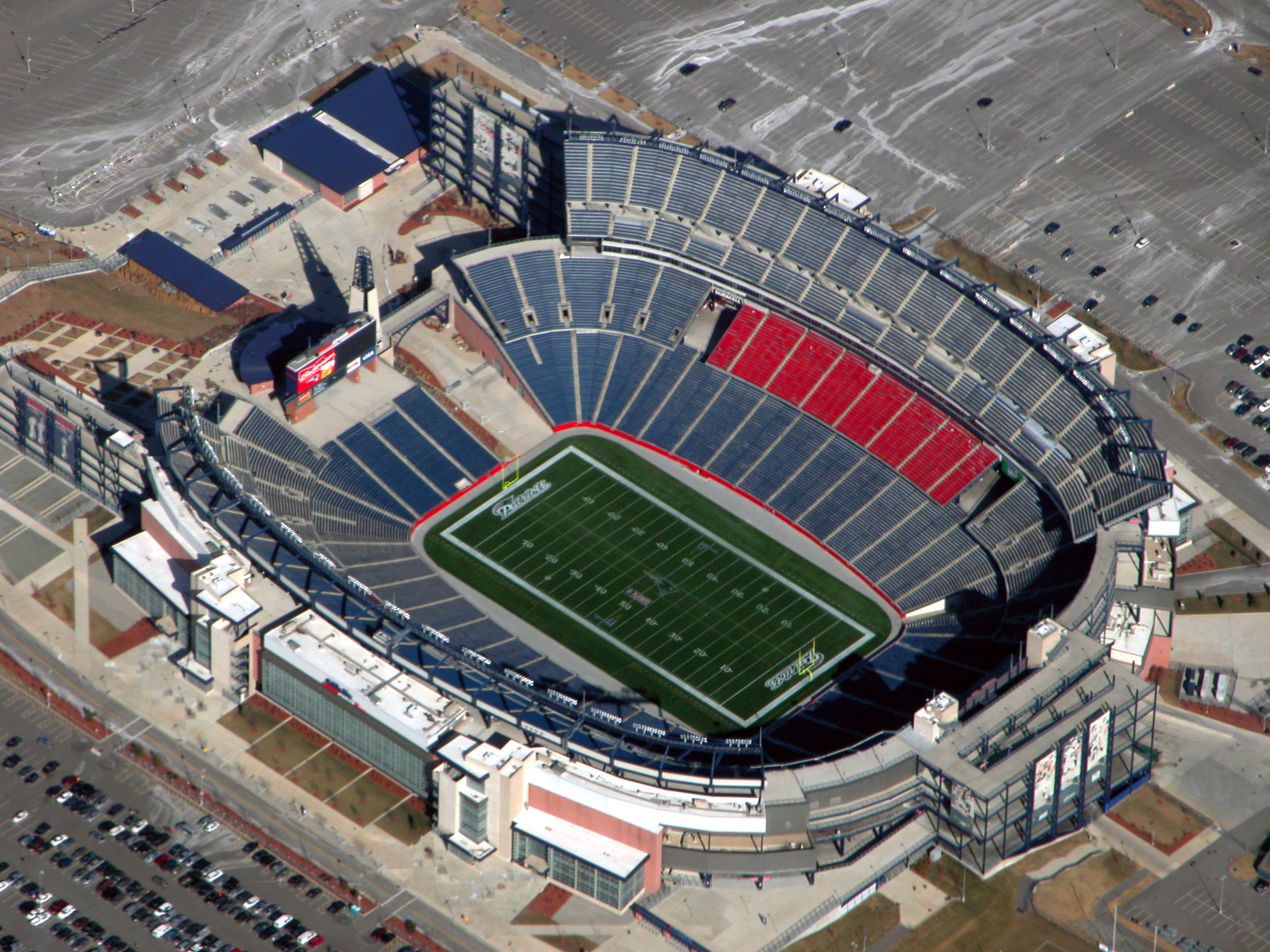
Indianapolis Colts (4) (11–5)	New England Patriots (1) (12–4)
7	45
Head coach: Chuck Pagano	Head coach: Bill Belichick
	1	2	3	4	Total
IND	0	7	0	0	7
NE	14	3	21	7	45
- Date: January 18, 2015
- Stadium: Gillette Stadium; Foxborough, Massachusetts
- Favorite: Patriots by 7
- Referee: Walt Anderson
- Attendance: 68,755

TV in the United States
- Network: CBS
- Announcers: Jim Nantz and Phil Simms

The American Football Conference (AFC) Championship Game for the 2014 season was played on January 18, 2015, at Gillette Stadium in Foxborough, Massachusetts, home of the Patriots, who hosted the Colts. The winning team would advance to play in Super Bowl XLIX. Before the game, the Colts had notified the NFL that they suspected the Patriots were underinflating balls, but provided no specific information.

During the first half of the AFC Championship Game, Patriots quarterback Tom Brady threw an interception to Colts linebacker D'Qwell Jackson. After the play was over, Jackson handed the ball to the Colts equipment manager for safekeeping as a souvenir. Early reports suggested that Jackson was the first to suspect the ball was deflated, but Jackson said he did not notice anything wrong with the ball he caught. Jackson says he actually did not even know the ball was taken or that the controversy existed until he was being driven home from the team's charter plane after the Colts had arrived in Indianapolis. "I wouldn't know how that could even be an advantage or a disadvantage," Jackson said, "I definitely wouldn't be able to tell if one ball had less pressure than another." After Jackson's interception, the team notified NFL Gameday Operations that they "understood that there was a problem with the inflation level of a Patriots football."

At halftime, NFL officials inspected the footballs. Former NFL referee Gerry Austin initially, and incorrectly, stated that 11 of the 12 balls used by the Patriots were measured to be two pounds per square inch below the minimum amount, but later reports contradicted this allegation, stating that only a single ball was two pounds per square inch below the minimum, while others were just a few ticks under the minimum. It was subsequently revealed that in NFL Official Clete Blakeman's measurement sequence (which was deemed to be the more accurate of the two gauges), five of eleven footballs measured below 11.0 psi (76 kPa), this being less than 90% of the officially mandated minimum pressure and a full two pounds below the claimed original inflation target (a magnitude of pressure loss difficult to account for through environmental factors alone).

According to NFL Senior Vice President of Officiating Dean Blandino, referees do not log the pressure of the balls before the game, or check during the game, and did not do so in this case. Walt Anderson, the referee, gauged the footballs. The Patriots' game balls were re-inflated at halftime to meet specifications and were reintroduced into the game.

No issues were raised on the pressure of the footballs used in the second half. The pressures of four of the Colts' footballs were measured at halftime using two gauges, and were found to be within regulation on one of the two gauges, but not on the other gauge. The remainder were not measured because, according to the Wells Report, "the officials were running out of time before the start of the second half."

The Patriots led 17–7 at halftime; in the second half, the Patriots scored 28 points for a final score of 45–7.

== Investigation ==
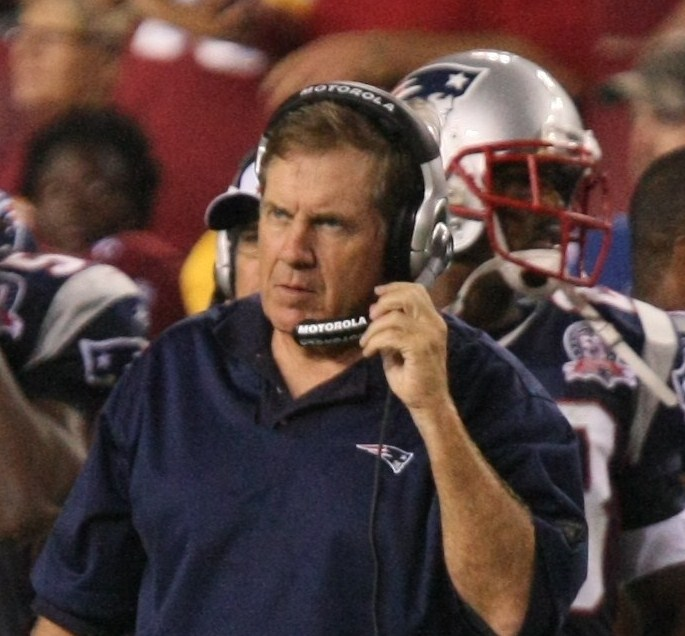
Bill Belichick

The NFL began an investigation into the underinflation of the game balls in the 2014–2015 playoffs. The report of the investigation was released in May 2015.

On January 22, Patriots head coach Bill Belichick indicated that he did not know anything about the balls being underinflated until the day after the event, and that the New England Patriots would "cooperate fully" with any investigation. He said,

When I came in Monday morning, I was shocked to hear about the news reports about the footballs. I had no knowledge of the situation until Monday morning. [...] I think we all know that quarterbacks, kickers, specialists have certain preferences on the footballs. They know a lot more than I do. They're a lot more sensitive to it than I am. I hear them comment on it from time to time, but I can tell you, and they will tell you, that there's never any sympathy whatsoever from me on that subject. Zero. [...] Tom's personal preferences on his footballs are something that he can talk about in much better detail and information than I could possibly provide.

Patriots quarterback Tom Brady initially referred to the accusations as "ridiculous". Brady also held a news conference on January 22, preparing his team with a talk beforehand. He denied any involvement and stated that the National Football League had not contacted him in regard to their investigation. He went on to say that he was "handling the situation before the Super Bowl".

HeadSmart Labs found that similar weather changes caused an average 1.8 psi drop in football pressure. They also reported that the air in an electric pump could reach 130 °F (54 °C).

On January 27, an anonymous league source stated that the investigation was focusing on a Patriots locker room attendant who was seen on surveillance video taking the 24 game footballs (12 from each team) into a restroom for approximately 90 seconds. This video was provided to the NFL by the New England Patriots the day after the 45–7 Patriots victory.

Blandino confirmed on January 29 that the NFL checks, but does not log, the pregame pressure of each football, and therefore there is no record of where in the 12.5 to 13.5 psi range each Patriots and Colts football was before the game. In the same news conference, referee Bill Vinovich said,

We test them. It's 12.5 to 13.5. We put 13 in every ball. ... Dean tested a couple in the office and had one underinflated and one to specs, and you really couldn't tell the difference unless you actually sat there and tried to squeeze the thing or did some extraordinary thing. If someone just tossed you the ball, especially in 20 degree weather, you're going to pretty much play with the ball. They are going to be hard. You're not going to notice the difference.

Ian Rapoport released a report February 1 citing anonymous league sources who indicated that amongst the 11 of the 12 footballs used in the first half judged by the officials to be under the minimum PSI, just one was two pounds under, while "many" were just a few ticks under.

The investigation also found that officials noticed during the game that a game ball was missing, and two different officials handed replacement balls to a Patriots equipment manager. One of those officials was reportedly fired from the NFL for selling game balls for personal profit, though the NFL denied this claim. The Patriots even submitted an amicus brief on behalf of Brady, who filed a federal lawsuit against the league to overturn his suspension, straddling the line between NFL stakeholder and whistleblower.

=== Origin of the investigation ===
Ryan Grigson, speaking at the 2016 NFL Combine, stated that "prior to the AFC Championship Game, we notified the league about our concerns that the Patriots might be using underinflated footballs". According to the NFL's investigation, "Grigson, Sullivan, and other members of the Colts equipment staff referenced the Colts Week 11 game against the Patriots in Indianapolis. During that game, Colts strong safety Mike Adams intercepted two passes thrown by Tom Brady… the intercepted footballs appeared to be coated in a tacky substance and seemed spongy or soft when squeezed." A New York Post article noted that Grigson's claim implied that the NFL had advance knowledge of the issue and was trying to run a sting operation, contradicting Blandino's claim that it was an issue that "came up in the first half". The claim also contradicts NFL executive vice president of football operations Troy Vincent's statement that Grigson notified the league "during the second quarter of the game".

=== Wells Report ===
On January 23, the NFL hired Manhattan attorney Ted Wells to "get to the bottom of Deflategate." Wells previously had worked with the NFL to "get to the bottom" of the Miami Dolphins bullying scandal between Richie Incognito and Jonathan Martin. In a press release, following the league's decision to hire Wells, the NFL claimed that the investigation "will be thorough and objective, and is being pursued expeditiously" with the participation of league executive vice president Jeff Pash. Many, especially in the New England media, questioned how Wells could act impartially given his history with the NFL. Some critics wanted an investigator without ties to the NFL appointed to investigate the alleged scandal. After four months of waiting, the NFL published a 243-page investigative report that alleged that it was "more probable than not" that the Patriots' equipment personnel had deliberately circumvented the rules. Brady was implicated as it was deemed more probable than not that he was "generally aware" of the deflation. The report further stated that Belichick and other members of the coaching staff were not involved in the situation. The report focused on the communications and actions of locker-room attendant Jim McNally and equipment assistant John Jastremski. The report concluded it was "more probable than not" that the two deliberately released air from Patriots game balls after they were tested by game officials. In several texts between Jastremski and McNally, the two mentioned and joked about inflation, deflation, needles and gifts from Brady to McNally. Brady was a constant reference point in these discussions. McNally referred to himself as "the deflator" in a text message to Jastremski as far back as May 2014.

The Wells Report relied on scientific analysis performed by the Exponent consulting company and supported by Dr. Daniel Marlow, a Princeton University physics professor. The analysis concluded that no studied factors accounted for the loss of air pressure exhibited by the Patriots' game balls. The Wells Report asserted that the scientific study supported the report's conclusion that the loss of air pressure may be the result of human intervention.

==== Physics argument ====
The Wells Report's physics argument, based on a number of experiments as well as on theoretical modeling, alleged that several theoretical sources of variability (differences in game use, alleged "vigorous rubbing" by the Patriots before play, leakage during the game and variations in football volume) could be set aside as they had no discernible effect. Based on documented habit, as well as the recollections of referee Walt Anderson, the Patriots balls were (as usual) set around 12.5 psi, and the Colts balls around 13.0 psi, before their games. The ideal gas law shows that footballs inflated in a warm environment will drop in pressure in a cold environment; however, a football is not a thermos, and the footballs would have rapidly started to reinflate when taken to the officials' locker room for halftime testing. (Wells estimates that the Patriots balls had two to four minutes to repressurize before measurements began; the measurements themselves spanned an estimated four to five minutes.)

Besides temperature-based deflation and the timing of the measurements, the wetness or dryness of a ball's surface also has a small but detectable effect on the measured pressure, and minor measurement error may be caused by the gauges. During halftime, the referees used two gauges on each ball: one bearing a Wilson logo and one without. The non-logo gauge was the one that Wells believed to have been used by Anderson to confirm the pregame pressure of the balls, despite Anderson's recollection of using the logo gauge. The logo-bearing gauge appeared to consistently run at least 0.35 psi above the (accurately calibrated) non-logo gauge, but both were determined to be extremely consistent and precise. The logo gauge was shown to be inaccurate (running high) but consistently precise, and therefore the report claimed it as additional confirmation that the non-logo measurement was correct (with the exception of Colts ball #3, below). Wells believed that Blakeman and NFL official Dyrol Prioleau used the non-logo and logo gauges respectively in the Patriots' halftime tests, and that the two men switched gauges for the Colts' halftime tests.

Even with the combined effect of wet vs. dry balls, temperature-driven pressure loss from the 50 °F (10 °C) halftime game weather followed by partial temperature-driven pressure increase inside the warm locker room and errors in measurement, Wells concluded that, without absolute certainty, there was no studied "set of credible environmental or physical factors that completely accounts" for the total measured pressure loss.

The Exponent science report alleged that no credible environmental or physical factors within the game characteristics fully explained the additional loss of pressure in the Patriots' footballs relative to the Colts' footballs.

Below are the halftime football measurements by team and referee:

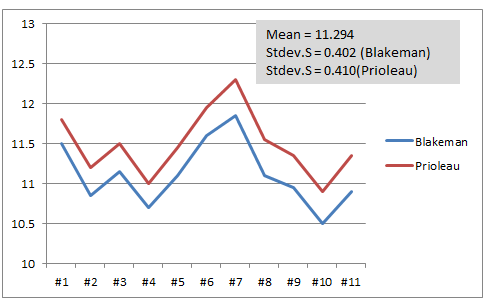
Plot and statistics of mean and standard deviation from measured Patriots footballs at 2015 AFC championship game. The Wells Report considers the lower of the two plotted lines to be accurate. Y axis 10 to 13 psi.

Patriots ball	Blakeman	Prioleau
#1	11.50	11.80
#2	10.85	11.20
#3	11.15	11.50
#4	10.70	11.00
#5	11.10	11.45
#6	11.60	11.95
#7	11.85	12.30
#8	11.10	11.55
#9	10.95	11.35
#10	10.50	10.90
#11	10.90	11.35

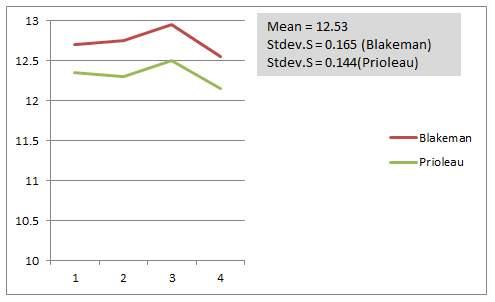
Plot and statistics of mean and standard deviation from measured Colts footballs at 2015 AFC championship game. The Wells Report considers the lower of the two plotted lines to be accurate. Y axis 10 to 13 psi

Colts ball	Blakeman	Prioleau
1	12.70	12.35
2	12.75	12.30
3*	12.50	12.95
4	12.55	12.15

Exponent believes the measurements for Colts ball #3 involve some sort of transcription error by the original NFL transcriber, as it is the only row that reverses the usual logo vs. non-logo gauge differential.

==== Reactions to the report ====
Many Patriots fans and New England media members assailed the report for its ambiguous allegations, including phrases such as "more probable than not" and "generally aware" in relation to Brady's knowledge of the situation, and the report's minimization of the NFL's wrongdoing in relation to the air pressure of the footballs. Many New England fans were furious at ESPN, especially at Chris Mortensen, for broadcasting news stories that were seen as painting the Patriots in a negative light. Mark Brunell and Jerome Bettis strongly criticized Brady on ESPN, saying that based on their playing experience, it was unlikely that the balls had been underinflated without Brady's awareness.

On May 6, 2015, in reaction to the Wells Report, James Glanz of The New York Times wrote an article titled "In the End, Science Works Against the Patriots". The story took the position that the Patriots almost certainly cheated, and that the proof was based on the allegation that the ideal gas law could not explain the Patriots' football pressure. Joe Nocera of the same newspaper took the opposite position in a January 22, 2016, article titled "True Scandal of Deflategate Lies in the N.F.L.'s Behavior". Nocera argued that the analysis conducted by professor John Leonard concluding that no deflation occurred was "utterly convincing."

On May 7, when asked to comment on the report, Brady stated that he had no reaction because the report was just 30 hours old and he was still "digesting" it. He stated that he hoped to comment more fully in the future. He also referred to owner Robert Kraft's comments following the release of the report. Brady's agent Don Yee criticized the report, stating that investigators jumped to conclusions.

On May 12, lead author Ted Wells defended the report, indicating that text messages between Patriots game-day employees Jim McNally and John Jastremski about Brady were more than circumstantial evidence to implicate Brady.

On May 14, attorney Daniel L. Goldberg prepared a document rebutting specific charges made in the Wells Report, citing Nobel Prize-winning scientist Roderick MacKinnon, who has financial ties to Kraft. Goldberg has represented the Patriots and was present during all of the interviews of Patriots personnel conducted at Gillette Stadium.

In June 2015, the American Enterprise Institute, a conservative think tank utilizing the ideal gas law as a basis for its report, released an independent scientific analysis that concluded that the Wells Report was "deeply flawed" and that "[i]t is ... unlikely that the Patriots deflated the footballs." The report noted the lack of evidence of a pressure rise during the measurements and used it to challenge the timing assumptions and the question of how much warming happened to Patriots' and Colts' footballs, and thus the question of whether the pressure differences could be explained by science. The NFL responded that timing still could not explain the pressure declines.

On August 19, 2015, New York Law School professor and self-described Patriots detractor Robert Blecker posted an article "DeflateGate: The Smoking Gun" in which he looked at pictures in the Wells Report and concluded that they had been deliberately staged to make the referee's recollection about which gauge was used appear less reliable. 60 Minutes Sports later interviewed Blecker and showed the pictures.

On August 26, self-described Patriots fan Robert F. Young posted a letter online that he had sent to the judge reviewing the Brady suspension. The letter requested permission to file an amicus curiae brief. The judge posted the letter to the official court docket on September 10, 2015. The brief asserted that the lack of pressure rise noted by the American Enterprise Institute report was not the result of timing differences but was caused when Exponent deliberately rigged the warming test to produce an artificially high result as compared to the game-day events, which occurred when Exponent did not properly simulate how the Patriots' footballs had remained in the bag. The brief claimed that the Exponent appendix to the Wells Report provided sufficient proof of the deception and that Exponent lied in its assertion that the variation in ball pressure could not be explained by science. The brief also detailed how heat flow theory could be used to calculate that the warming difference caused by the bag on game day was sufficient to completely explain the difference between the NFL/Exponent simulation results based on the referee's recollection of the gauge and the actual ball pressures. The brief examined each of Exponent's reasons for not believing the referee as to which gauge had been used before the game, arguing why Exponent would not have actually believed each reason that it had provided. It noted an observation by Professor Blecker that Exponent's timing assumption for the Colts' footballs had no basis in information provided by the NFL and was not explained in any way. It noted that with the more generally agreed timing assumption of the Colts' balls having been tested at the last minute, the Exponent experimental simulation data was consistent with believing the referee. The brief argued that the Exponent work, when properly understood, shows that no air was improperly removed from the Patriots' footballs. On August 30, Young posted a pictorial summary of his case, including experimental data from Patriots fan Mike Greenway, not part of the brief, showing that even a dry bag, partially open, was sufficient to slow warming of a football that was at the top of the bag by 2.5 times relative to the result reached by Exponent's experimental work.

On August 31, writing an op-ed piece for WBUR-FM, Professor Blecker explained that the NFL and Exponent had been deceptive regarding crucial evidence and that it was most likely that the Patriots had not cheated. The op-ed mentioned that the "expert accusers" (Exponent) ignored the effect of the balls having remained in the bag on game day and linked to Young's website for further proof.

During an interview on 60 Minutes that aired on CBS on September 13, 2015, Blecker claimed that the NFL investigation was biased against the Patriots. He stated that the gauges used to measure the footballs at halftime were Walt Anderson's personal gauges and that, "if you want to know how much something has dropped, you've got to measure it with the same gauge before the game as you do at halftime." Blecker also noted that the side-by-side comparison of the two gauges shown in the Wells Report showed them to be of different sizes. The photos also showed that the NFL measured the two needles at different spots to make the smaller needle appear longer. According to Blecker, the different needle sizes resulted in one gauge reading at a constant measure of about 0.4 psi higher than the other. On December 14, 2015, Blecker filed an amicus curiae brief accusing the NFL of being "infected with bias, unfairness, evident partiality and occasional fraud."

On November 25, 2015, MIT professor John Leonard posted a lecture on YouTube titled "Taking the Measure of Deflategate" in which he explained why the Exponent portion of the Wells Report contained technical failures that led to an incorrect conclusion that footballs were deflated. Leonard explained the ideal gas law calculations and detailed how others had erred by not considering the effect absolute pressure. He concluded that the Patriots' footballs met the ideal gas law prediction.

"If I had to stake my reputation and my career on it, the Patriots' balls match the ideal gas law prediction, and I don't know why people can't get that." — John Leonard, "Taking the Measure of Deflategate" @ 47:37

Leonard pointed out inconsistencies in the Exponent report regarding the effect of wetness on volume, and cited a study by Carnegie Mellon University graduate student Thomas Healy that showed as much as a three-percent increase in volume if the balls are wet. Leonard agreed with previous analysis that showed slowed warming when the balls were kept in a bag—something that he claims that the Exponent reports ignored. He also detailed technical failures of the transient analysis in the Exponent report, which did not show a slower rate of warming for wet balls. Leonard argued that the Exponent report contained incorrect "amplitudes" in some graphs that underrepresented the total warming of both the Colts' and Patriots' balls.

== Sanctions by the NFL and appeals ==
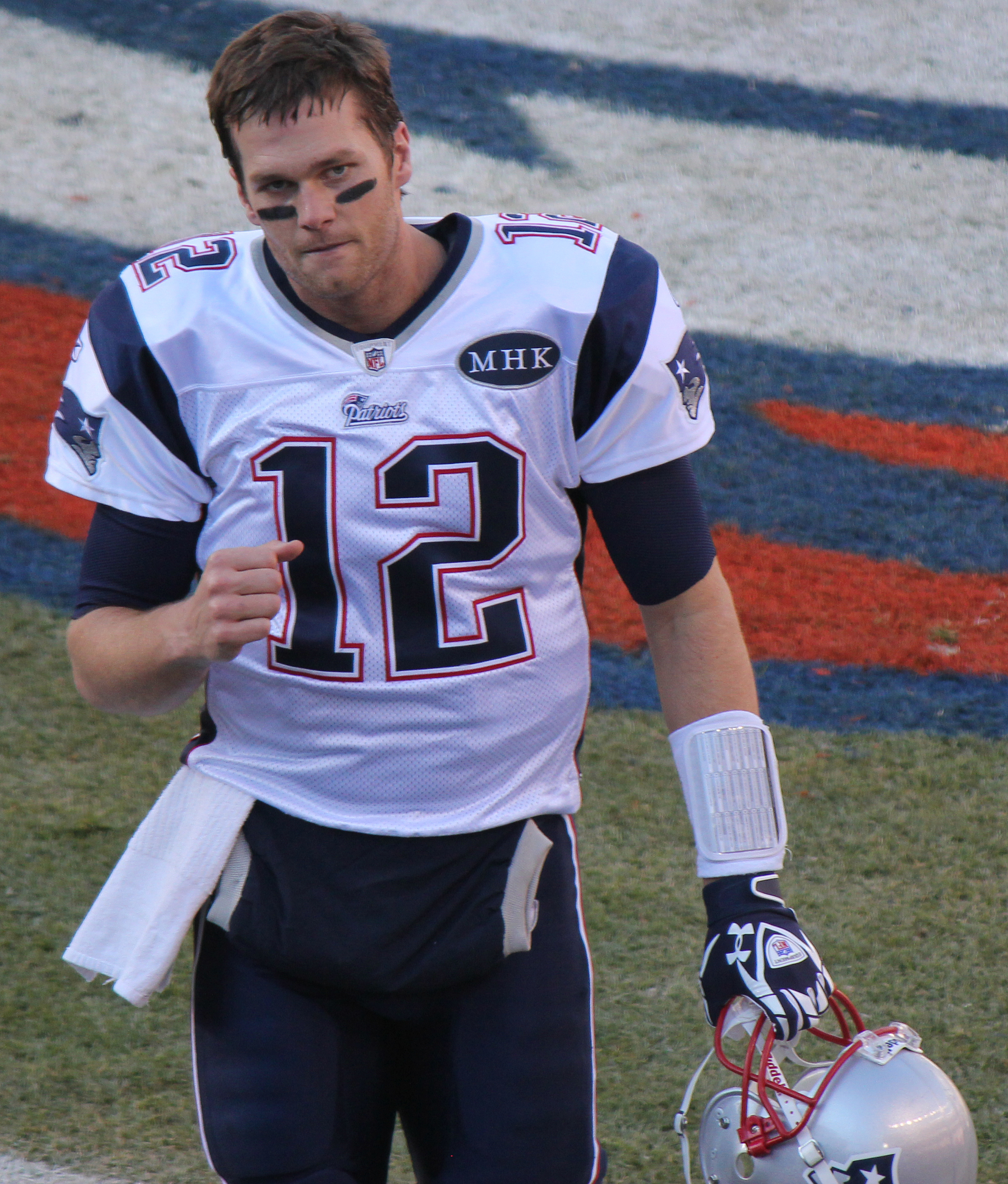
Tom Brady

On May 11, 2015, the NFL announced that Tom Brady was suspended without pay for four games of the upcoming season for his involvement, based on "substantial and credible evidence" that Brady knew that Patriots employees were deflating footballs and that he failed to cooperate with investigators. The Patriots were fined $1 million and were required to forfeit their first-round pick in the 2016 NFL Draft along with their fourth-round pick in the 2017 NFL draft. NFL executive vice president of football operations Troy Vincent's May 11 letter to Brady stated in part: "Your actions as set forth in the report clearly constitute conduct detrimental to the integrity of and public confidence in the game of professional football. ... With respect to your particular involvement, the report established that there is substantial and credible evidence to conclude you were at least generally aware of the actions of the Patriots' employees involved in the deflation of the footballs and that it was unlikely that their actions were done without your knowledge. Moreover, the report documents your failure to cooperate fully and candidly with the investigation, including by refusing to produce any relevant electronic evidence (emails, texts, etc.), despite being offered extraordinary safeguards by the investigators to protect unrelated personal information, and by providing testimony that the report concludes was not plausible and contradicted by other evidence."

The NFL also announced a three-day appeal deadline for charges against Brady according to the 2011 collective-bargaining agreement, and a deadline of May 21 for charges against the team. Brady's agent indicated that the suspension would be appealed. The Patriots suspended Jim McNally and John Jastremski indefinitely on May 6, and the NFL indicated that the men could not be rehired without the league's approval. Patriots owner Robert Kraft issued a statement stating that the punishment "far exceeded" reasonable expectations, was based on circumstantial evidence and that Brady had Kraft's unconditional support. After Judge Berman vacated the Brady suspension, the Patriots requested that Jastremski and McNally be reinstated; the NFL officially did so on September 16, 2015.

Commentary on the initial punishment was mixed. Bleacher Report referred to the penalties as "brutal." Various commentators also expressed that the Patriots' reputation as a team that bends rules appeared to factor into the harshness of the punishment. Others described the punishment as "firm but fair."

=== NFLPA appeal ===
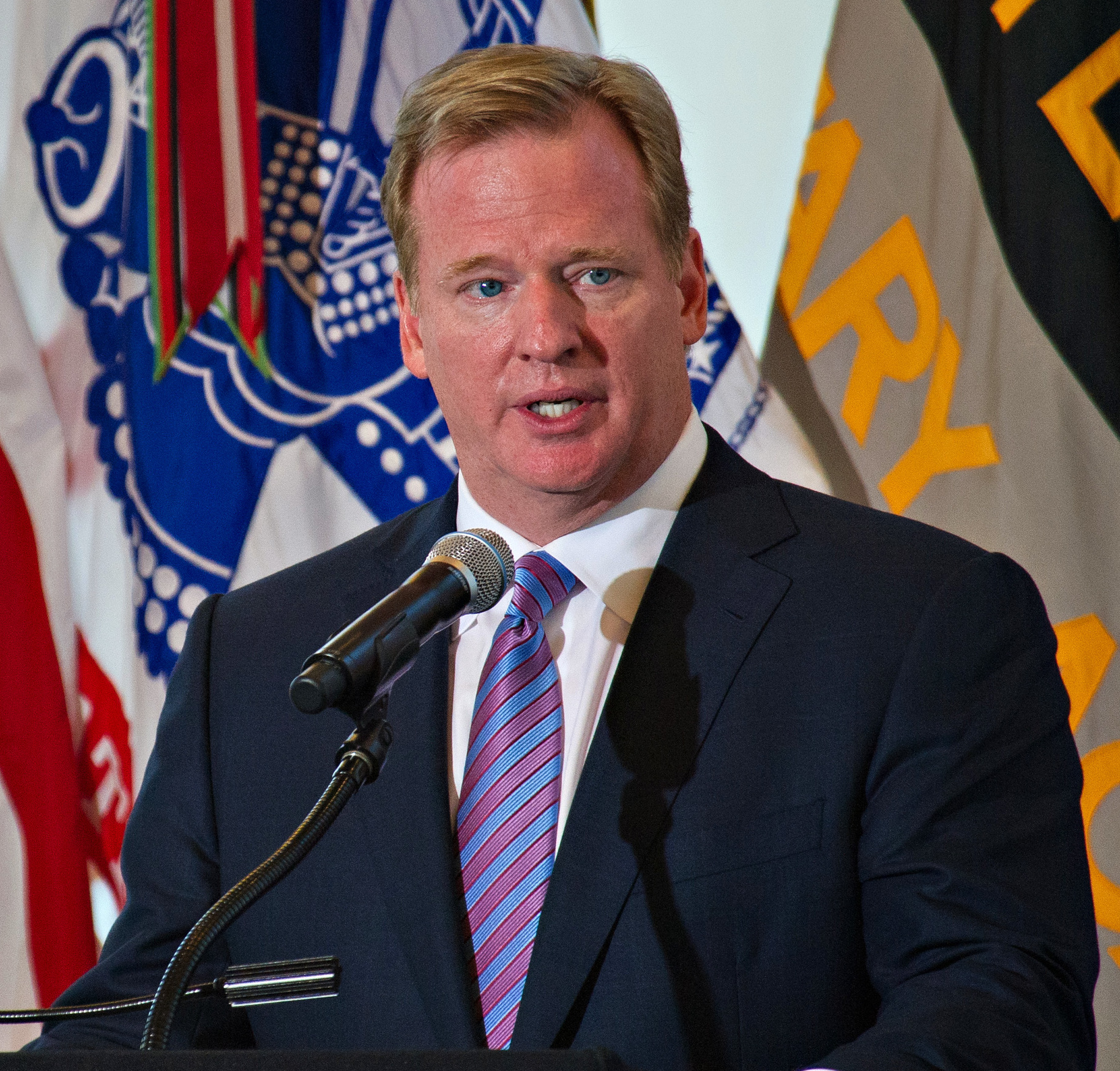
Roger Goodell

On May 14, the National Football League Players Association (NFLPA) filed an appeal of Brady's four-game suspension. The NFL also announced that Roger Goodell would preside over Brady's appeal, despite objections from the NFLPA, which requested a neutral arbitrator.

On May 19, Kraft told media at an NFL owners' meeting that he did not plan to appeal the penalties. Kraft's decision had no impact on the NFLPA's appeal on behalf of Brady. Patriots fans held a "Free Brady" rally at Gillette Stadium on May 26, 2015.

On June 23, Brady appealed his suspension before Goodell at the NFL's offices in New York City in a 10-hour-long hearing. In this hearing, NFLPA lawyer Jeffrey Kessler suggested that the Exponent Report and Wells Report taken in tandem provided an exoneration of Brady. With the Exponent Report stating that pressure changes from gloving would wear off, and the Wells report stating that the footballs were inflated immediately after the gloving, thus sending footballs to Anderson in an underinflated state. Kessler then abandoned this line of questioning.

=== Appeal hearing ===
On July 28, Goodell announced that he had upheld the four-game suspension, citing Brady's destruction of his cell phone as a critical factor: "On or shortly before March 6, the day that Tom Brady met with independent investigator Ted Wells and his colleagues, Brady directed that the cell phone he had used for the prior four months be destroyed," the league statement read. "He did so even though he was aware that the investigators had requested access to text messages and other electronic information that had been stored on that phone. During the four months that the cell phone was in use, Brady had exchanged nearly 10,000 text messages, none of which can now be retrieved from that device. The destruction of the cell phone was not disclosed until June 18, almost four months after the investigators had first sought electronic information from Brady." Despite these claims, the league was offered the opportunity to recover all text messages in question, stating in a footnote of the ruling, "After the hearing and after the submission of post-hearing briefs, Mr. Brady’s certified agents offered to provide a spreadsheet that would identify all of the individuals with whom Mr. Brady had exchanged text messages during [the relevant time] period; the agents suggested that the League could contact those individuals and request production of any relevant text messages that they retained." The NFL declined to pursue these records, stating in the footnote that following up on those records was "not practical." On the afternoon of the 28th, the NFL filed papers in Manhattan federal court seeking to confirm Goodell's decision.

On July 29, the NFLPA announced that it had filed an injunction that would prevent the NFL from enforcing the four-game suspension. On July 30, a Minnesota judge ordered the lawsuit be transferred to the Southern District of New York.

=== NFL and NFLPA motions ===
On July 29, Brady released a statement on his Facebook page criticizing Goodell's decision to uphold the suspension, stating in part:

I am very disappointed by the NFL's decision to uphold the 4 game suspension against me. I did nothing wrong, and no one in the Patriots organization did either. Despite submitting to hours of testimony over the past 6 months, it is disappointing that the Commissioner upheld my suspension based upon a standard that it was "probable" that I was "generally aware" of misconduct. The fact is that neither I, nor any equipment person, did anything of which we have been accused. I also disagree with yesterdays narrative surrounding my cellphone. I replaced my broken Samsung phone with a new iPhone 6 AFTER my attorneys made it clear to the NFL that my actual phone device would not be subjected to investigation under ANY circumstances. As a member of a union, I was under no obligation to set a new precedent going forward, nor was I made aware at any time during Mr. Wells investigation, that failing to subject my cell phone to investigation would result in ANY discipline.

Most importantly, I have never written, texted, emailed to anybody at anytime, anything related to football air pressure before this issue was raised at the AFC Championship game in January. To suggest that I destroyed a phone to avoid giving the NFL information it requested is completely wrong. To try and reconcile the record and fully cooperate with the investigation after I was disciplined in May, we turned over detailed pages of cell phone records and all of the emails that Mr. Wells requested. We even contacted the phone company to see if there was any possible way we could retrieve any/all of the actual text messages from my old phone. In short, we exhausted every possibility to give the NFL everything we could and offered to go thru the identity for every text and phone call during the relevant time.

He dismissed my hours of testimony and it is disappointing that he found it unreliable...I will not allow my unfair discipline to become a precedent for other NFL players without a fight.

Kraft stated at a news conference that "I was wrong to put my faith in the league" and apologized to the team's fans for accepting the "harshest penalty in history of NFL for an alleged ball violation" because he thought that cooperating would help exonerate Brady.

The Patriots released email exchanges between the team and the NFL on July 31, 2015. The emails, beginning in February 2015, show the Patriots' frustration over the NFL's failure to investigate the source of leaks that were proven to consist largely of incorrect information. Mike Florio of ProFootballTalk.com later contrasted Wells' lack of concern regarding these leaks with his "outrage" over leaks from Columbia University after it was asked to consult on the investigation.

On July 31, 2015, Tom E. Curran of Comcast SportsNet New England reported that NFL vice president of game operations Mike Kensil was the "main source" of the report regarding the underinflation of the Patriots' footballs.

=== Reactions to the transcript of the appeal hearing ===
On August 4, as part of the appeals process, the transcript from Brady's appeal hearing was made public. Analysts pointed out that the transcript raised numerous issues regarding both Goodell's ruling and the Wells Report. For example, Goodell's decision upholding the suspension stated:

"The sharp contrast between [sic] the almost complete absence of communications through the AFC championship game undermines any suggestion during the three days following the AFC championship game that the communications addressed only preparation of footballs for the Super Bowl rather than the tampering allegations and their anticipated responses to inquiries about the tampering."

Dan Wetzel of Yahoo! Sports notes that this claim directly contradicts Brady's testimony:

"While preparing for the Super Bowl was a primary concern – is that surprising? – Brady couldn't have been more clear that other topics were broached, including the scandal, and that they didn't ONLY discuss football prep for the Seattle game."

This, along with other issues raised, led Wetzel to ask "how does anyone in the NFL – owner, coach, player or fan – possibly trust the league office to investigate and rule on anything ever again?" Sally Jenkins of the Washington Post asked on Twitter whether this "beg[s] [sic] that other disciplinary hearings be unsealed, given how NFL misconstrued testimony?" The transcript also showcased that league officials such as Troy Vincent were ignorant of the ideal gas law and natural changes in PSI.

=== Appearance of conflict of interest ===
The independence of Wells and Paul, Weiss & Co. has been questioned, notably by Mike Florio, as has an apparent conflict of interest: Lorin Reisner, who worked on the Wells Report, served as the attorney who cross-examined Brady at the appeal hearing on behalf of the NFL, and Wells asserted attorney–client privilege during the hearing.

== U.S. District Court vacates suspension ==
On August 12, the NFL Players Association and Tom Brady met the NFL in the United States District Court for the Southern District of New York at the Daniel Patrick Moynihan United States Courthouse in Foley Square to discuss a possible settlement. No settlement was reached, and the next scheduled court date was August 19. The judge asked to know what exact evidence linked Brady to deflating footballs, and NFL lawyer Daniel Nash responded that there was "no direct evidence Mr. Brady clearly knew about this," including records of text messages and phone calls between Brady and one of the two Patriots employees implicated. He also indicated that there was no "smoking gun" showing that Brady had direct knowledge that the balls were deflated.

It was reported that judge Richard M. Berman had pushed the NFL to settle during the August 19 hearing. While he could not force either side to settle the case, Berman was critical of the NFL's argument with questions of fundamental fairness and impartiality. It was also reported that Berman did not wish to decide on the case and preferred a settlement, and that by highlighting the most egregious flaws in the NFL's case, he might encourage the league to settle. The next settlement hearing occurred on August 31 with no change in position by either side. Judge Berman indicated that a final decision would be rendered within a week.

On September 3, Judge Berman overturned Brady's suspension, citing a lack of fair due process for Brady. The NFL announced that it would appeal the decision.

On October 26, 2015, the NFL filed a 61-page court brief to appeal Judge Berman's decision. Goodell stated that the appeal was not related to Brady's culpability but rather was a matter of the commissioner's current power that had been negotiated into the 2011 collective-bargaining agreement.

== U.S. Court of Appeals reinstates suspension ==
At a March 3, 2016, hearing in New York City, the three-judge panel of the United States Court of Appeals for the Second Circuit scrutinized NFLPA lawyer Jeffrey L. Kessler more intensely than it did NFL lawyer Paul Clement, and circuit judge Denny Chin stated that "the evidence of ball tampering is compelling, if not overwhelming."

On April 25, 2016, the Second Circuit reinstated Brady's four-game suspension for the 2016 regular season. Circuit judge Barrington Daniels Parker, Jr., joined by Chin, wrote that they could not "second-guess" the arbitration but were merely determining that it had "met the minimum legal standards established by the Labor Management Relations Act of 1947." Circuit chief judge Robert Katzmann dissented, writing that the NFL's use of fines for using stickum was "highly analogous" and that here "the Commissioner was doling out his own brand of industrial justice."

On May 23, 2016, Brady petitioned the court of appeals, requesting an en banc rehearing by the full court, but the petition was denied on July 13, 2016. Boston Globe columnists Bob Hohler and Ben Volin wrote: "Patriots great Tom Brady suffered a resounding defeat in a federal appeals court Wednesday, leaving him with the daunting option of a last-ditch plea to the Supreme Court in his arduous quest to clear his name. More than 14 months after the National Football League punished Brady for allegedly conspiring with Patriots employees, including an aide who dubbed himself The Deflator, to tamper with the air pressure of footballs in a conference championship game, the US Court of Appeals for the Second Circuit flatly rejected Brady's appeal of his four-game suspension. Not a single judge on the 13-member panel issued a dissent." Two days later, Brady announced that he would not appeal further and would serve his four-game suspension at the start of the 2016 NFL season.

== Media coverage ==
=== Initial reaction ===
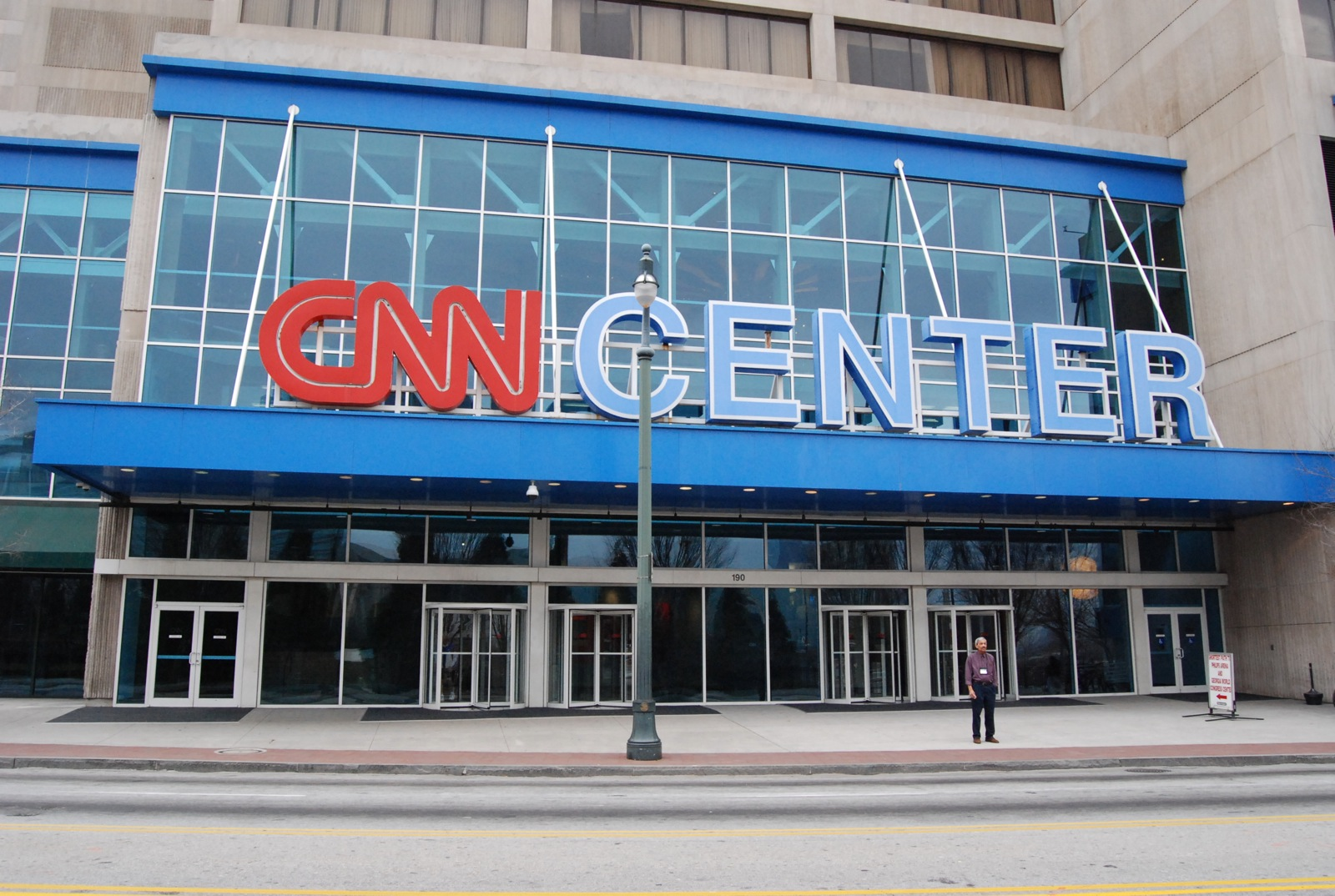
Roxanne Jones of CNN argued that the Patriots should have been disqualified from participation in the Super Bowl even before the NFL had begun its investigation.

Initial media reaction to the incident was extremely strong. After the reports emerged before the completion of the NFL's investigation, several media outlets had already called for Belichick–or even the entire Patriots team–to be disqualified from participation in Super Bowl XLIX. Dan Wetzel of Yahoo! Sports strongly criticized the league for deferring much of the investigation until after the Super Bowl so as not to interfere with the Patriots' preparations. Former quarterback Troy Aikman asserted that Deflategate was worse than Bountygate, and that Belichick should receive a harsher penalty than the one-year suspension New Orleans Saints coach Sean Payton had received. Other voices in the press took a strident but opposing view, calling it a "phony scandal" or "the dumbest sports scandal ever," and accused the media generally of overhyping the issue. Factors that may have helped fuel media interest in the incident included:

- The 2007 Spygate incident, in which the Patriots were sanctioned for positioning a video camera in an unapproved location to film an opponent's defensive signals in violation of a memo was sent to the NFL teams that had misstated the applicable rules.
- Unrelated incidents earlier in the season involving NFL players, such as allegations that Ray Rice had physically abused his girlfriend and Adrian Peterson had whipped his child, and the media's focus on the reaction by the league.
- The two-week hiatus between championship games and the Super Bowl, which creates natural pressure on sports journalists to "fill the void."
- Chris Mortensen's report, citing league sources (alleged to be the NFL's executive vice president of football operations, Troy Vincent), that claimed that the balls were as low as 10.5 psi, which was shown to be false months later when measurements were released in the Wells Report. The Patriots released emails documenting their lawyers pleading with NFL attorneys to correct the record, but the NFL made no effort to do so. This led to criticism from Forbes that ESPN, perhaps because of its "unnerving" financial commitments with the league, was unable to report on the league objectively.

The strength of the initial media reaction to the incident contrasts with the superficial coverage that media outlets afforded to allegations that Cleveland Browns staff sent prohibited text messages or that the Atlanta Falcons may have secured an unfair advantage by generating artificial crowd noise during opponents' offensive snaps; some argued that if those accusations were true, "that's a far more serious offense than any deflated footballs could possibly be." In a November 2014 game between the Minnesota Vikings and Carolina Panthers, with a wind-chill temperature of −7 °F (−22 °C), both teams used sideline heaters to warm the footballs during the game in violation of league policies, but no penalties were issued in that case and the media reaction was superficial.

The controversy was not only the dominant topic in the buildup to the Super Bowl, but was discussed beyond sports media. National Review and Rush Limbaugh provided social commentary. Limbaugh and fellow talk host Mark Levin compared the amount of attention devoted to the controversy to the amount devoted to the death of King Abdullah of Saudi Arabia and the change of government in Yemen, a commentary on the priorities of the American public.

=== Post-Super Bowl coverage ===
Deflategate continued as a major news item following the Super Bowl and during the offseason, as the NFL issued its report and penalties were imposed and then appealed. As the story became increasingly less about football and more about scientific and legal processes, it became common for the media to mention "Deflategate fatigue." Eventually the media began to mock itself in relation to the reporting of Deflategate fatigue. Brady's successful appeal shortly before the start of the regular season reduced coverage while media attention returned to the games themselves, although coverage increased again for the prime-time game between the Colts and the Patriots in Week 6 of the 2015 NFL season. Media coverage increased again following the Second Circuit's decision on April 25, 2016, to reinstate Brady's four-game suspension. Boston Globe sports columnist Dan Shaughnessy concluded: "Bottom line: The Patriots were doing it. They had a system of deflating footballs after the balls were inspected by officials. Any agenda-less person who reads the Wells Report would come away with no other conclusion. The texts were unexplainable."

=== Other media ===
On January 24, 2015, Saturday Night Live parodied the scandal in a cold-open sketch with Beck Bennett as Bill Belichick and Taran Killam as Tom Brady.

On September 16, 2015, South Park parodied the Deflategate scandal in its Season 19 premiere episode "Stunning and Brave."

In the fall semester of 2015, the University of New Hampshire offered a 400-level course on Deflategate.

On May 12, 2015, Dave Portnoy of Barstool Sports and three other Barstool employees protested Brady's suspension by handcuffing themselves in the lobby of NFL headquarters. They were arrested for trespassing.

In April 2016, seven Patriots fans filed a lawsuit against the NFL, claiming that the loss of draft picks constituted fraud.

On October 27, 2017, Belichick was referenced in the rap group Migos' single "MotorSport" featuring Cardi B and Nicki Minaj. The song includes lyrics referencing his role in the scandal.

== Claims regarding an equipment attendant and a "K" ball ==
On February 17, 2015, ESPN reporter Kelly Naqi reported that Patriots ball attendant Jim McNally had tried "to introduce an unauthorized football"—lacking the markings found on approved footballs—into the game during the first half. Naqi's report did not indicate why or when this event had happened but alleged that NFL vice president of game operations Mike Kensil had visited the officials' locker room at halftime to inspect the game balls "in part because of the suspicions McNally's actions raised." Naqi later aired a report on ESPN's Outside the Lines in which she interviewed an Indianapolis-based former referee who claimed that NFL officials had been "aware" of McNally for years and had raised concerns about him. The football that McNally was alleged to have introduced into the game was a "K" ball, normally used for special-teams plays.

Naqi's report was immediately contradicted by ESPN reporter Adam Schefter, whose report cited sources stating that a "K" ball had gone missing and that an NFL employee in charge of collecting game balls for charity had handed the unmarked ball to McNally. Those sources also claimed that the NFL employee was fired after the game, as he had been taking footballs intended for charity and selling them at a profit "over a period of time."

== 2016 season ==
Tom Brady served a four-game suspension. He was not allowed to have any contact with the New England Patriots, including players, coaches or facilities, during the suspension. The Patriots began the season 3–1 with backups Jimmy Garoppolo and Jacoby Brissett; the loss was a 16-0 shutout loss to division rival Buffalo at home in Week 4.

The Patriots finished the regular season 14–2, with an 11–1 record after Brady returned as starting quarterback. Brady's only loss of the season came at the hands of the Seattle Seahawks, the team that he had defeated in the 2015 Super Bowl two weeks after the alleged incident. In the playoffs, the Patriots defeated the Houston Texans 34–16 in the divisional round and the Pittsburgh Steelers 36–17 in the AFC Championship Game. In Super Bowl LI the Patriots defeated the Atlanta Falcons 34–28, and Brady was named Super Bowl MVP for the fourth time.

The NFL rules committee changed the inspection rules for the 24,960 footballs used during the season:

"Two hours and 15 minutes prior to kickoff, both teams will be required to bring 24 footballs (12 primary and 12 back-up) to the Officials' Locker Room for inspection. Two Game Officials, designated by the Referee, will conduct the inspection and record the PSI measurement of each football. The League's Security Representative will observe the inspection process. Primary game balls for each team will be numbered one through 12, and any game ball within the allowable range of 12.5 PSI to 13.5 PSI will be approved, and the PSI level will not be altered. Any game ball that is determined to be over 13.5 PSI or under 12.5 PSI will either be deflated or inflated to 13.0 PSI. The same procedure will be followed with respect to the back-up set of game balls for each team."

— NFL Game Ball Procedures

On December 4, 2016, the New York Giants took possession of two Pittsburgh Steelers footballs after turnovers. They were tested on the sidelines by the Giants' staff and found to have 11.4 and 11.8 pounds of pressure. The NFL declined to investigate because the chain of custody of footballs from the locker room to the field was not compromised and no formal complaint had been lodged.

== Accusations of falsified data ==
In February 2022, sportswriter Mike Florio revealed that the NFL falsified data and even hid information that would have cleared the Patriots of wrongdoing. In his book Playmakers: How the NFL Really Works (And Doesn't), Florio revealed that NFL executives, specifically vice president Troy Vincent, jumped to conclusions about the air pressure inside the Patriots' footballs at halftime of the AFC Championship game. He also noted that 11 of the 12 Patriot footballs were not outside of the range predicted by the ideal gas law, and the other was only slightly below.

Another revelation revealed by Florio was that NFL general counsel Jeff Pash ordered that the records of all PSI data gathered from the 2015 season, which contained readings that would have exonerated the Patriots, be deleted. Leaked transcripts revealed that the NFL Senior Vice President of Football Operations, Dave Gardi, used false numbers in his letter to the Patriots which ordered that the team was to be investigated. It was also shown that Vincent did not instruct anyone to record the timing of the measurements taken, the temperature in the room during testing, if the footballs tested were wet or dry, and that he did not know which of the two air pressure gauges was used to make the pregame measurements. Vincent also admitted that he and other NFL executives never heard of the ideal gas law and were unaware that PSI in a football can change in certain environments.

== See also ==
- National Football League controversies
- Spygate (NFL)
- 2018 Australian ball-tampering scandal
- List of scandals with "-gate" suffix
- Colts–Patriots rivalry
