= Mike Florio =

American sportswriter (born 1965)

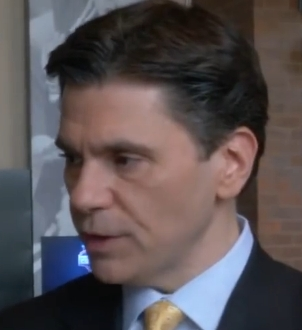
- Florio in 2014
- Born: Michael James Florio; June 8, 1965 (age 61); Bellaire, Ohio, U.S.
- Education: Carnegie Mellon University; West Virginia University
- Occupations: Lawyer; Sportswriter
- Notable credit: NBC Sports
- Spouse: Jill Florio
- Children: 1

Michael James Florio (born June 8, 1965) is an American sportswriter, author, radio host, and television commentator. He writes for Profootballtalk.com which he created and owns. He also hosts the daily NFL talk show PFT Live on Peacock with Chris Simms.

Florio is a contributor to NBC's Sunday night NFL studio show Football Night in America and appears in the Sunday Night Football digital postgame show. The show covers the NFL's top stories of the day and other commentators appear, namely Jason Garrett, Devin McCourty, and Maria Taylor. Additionally he appears with Peter King during halftime of NBC's coverage of Notre Dame football to discuss timely NFL topics. He is the author of Playmakers: How the NFL Really Works (And Doesn't), a book released in March 2022.

== Early life ==
Florio was born in Bellaire, Ohio and raised in Wheeling, West Virginia. He attended Wheeling Central Catholic High School and graduated in 1983.

He graduated from Carnegie Mellon University with a metallurgical engineering degree and one in "engineering and public policy" and from West Virginia University's law school in 1991.

== Sportswriter career ==
Florio began his sportswriting for a now-defunct site called NFLtalk.com in June 2000. The site was then bought out by ESPN.com, where Florio continued to write a rumor and news report. He worked for ESPN.com for six months.

On November 1, 2001, Florio created the website and blog Profootballtalk.com, which focuses on the National Football League. Florio, 36 at the time, began Profootballtalk.com as a sideline to practicing labor law in Clarksburg, West Virginia.

On June 14, 2009, it was announced that Profootballtalk.com would become an affiliate of NBC Sports, which would hold exclusive rights to Profootballtalk (PFT) content although Florio would retain ownership in a revenue-sharing deal.

After becoming a partner with NBC, Florio began contributing to NBC Sports' television coverage, including Football Night in America.

In June 2020, comments Florio had made about the LGBT community in PFT articles in 2005 and 2006 came to light. These comments included names like "homos", "fruits", "queers" and "fudge packers". Florio issued an apology for these comments on June 26, 2020.

== Personal life ==
Florio is married to Jill Florio; they have a son named Alex. They live in Bridgeport, West Virginia. Florio previously practiced law for 18 years and is a fan of the Minnesota Vikings.
