= Football Night in America =

- Current FNIA logo, in use since 2022 (Note: The logo shown is a "marquee" variant nominally reserved for broadcasts and large-scale formats; a version intended for print/digital formats omits the "marquee" linework.)
- Genre: Pre-game show
- Directed by: Drew Esocoff; Kaare Numme III
- Presented by: Maria Taylor; Devin McCourty; Jason Garrett; Mike Tomlin; Mike Florio; Steve Kornacki
- Opening theme: John Williams (2006–2011) & Joel Beckerman (Super Bowl XLVI–present)
- Ending theme: Same as opening
- Country of origin: United States
- Original language: English
- No. of seasons: 21 (through 2026 season)
- No. of episodes: 412

Production
- Executive producer: Fred Gaudelli (2006–2023)
- Producers: Rob Hyland; Matt Casey
- Production locations: Studio 8G, Comcast Building; New York City, New York (2006–2012); Studio 8H, Comcast Building; New York City, New York (2013); NBC Sports Headquarters; Stamford, Connecticut (2014–2025); Various NFL Stadiums (2006–present)
- Camera setup: Multi-camera
- Running time: 80 minutes
- Production companies: National Football League; NBC Sports

Original release
- Network: NBC; Peacock; Telemundo, TeleXitos and Universo (Spanish audio/broadcast)
- Release: September 10, 2006 – present

Related
- NFL on NBC; NBC Sunday Night Football

Football Night in America (FNIA), branded for sponsorship purposes as Football Night in America served by Applebee's, is an American pre-game show that is broadcast on NBC and Peacock, preceding its broadcasts of Sunday night and postseason National Football League (NFL) games. The program debuted on September 10, 2006, when NBC inaugurated its Sunday prime time game package. The 80-minute program airs live at 7:00 p.m. Eastern Time, and is broadcast from Studio 1 at NBC Sports Headquarters in Stamford, Connecticut. Prior to 2012, Football Night in America originally broadcast from the GE Building in New York City, first out of Studio 8G from 2006 to 2012 and in 2013, from Studio 8H, where Saturday Night Live is also taped.

The program's title closely resembles CBC Television's long-running Hockey Night in Canada franchise. In addition, NBC – along with ABC and Major League Baseball in a joint effort called "The Baseball Network" – had previously aired baseball games as the similarly titled Baseball Night in America from 1994 to 1995, a branding Fox has used for its Saturday evening games since 2012.

== Show format ==
=== 2000s ===
==== 2006 ====
===== Show sets =====
During the 2006 preseason, the Football Night team appeared at halftime from an exterior set at the site of that night's game, as the set at the GE Building was still being prepared.

===== Original format =====
The format for Football Night originally had the program begin with a video package, in which a football seemingly flies throughout the country. Several landmarks were featured in the introduction, including the Gateway Arch, the Golden Gate Bridge and the Empire State Building. After a welcome, the program featured a rundown of the day's scores, before a first visit from game announcers Al Michaels and John Madden.

By the end of the first half of the 2006 season, the simulated landmark flyover sequence was removed, and the reading of the game scores was replaced by a round table discussion segment called "The Week (number of NFL week) Buzz", during which the scores appeared at the bottom of the screen. Michaels and Madden were now shown only once during the broadcast, in the later segment, "Drive to Kickoff". Just before the first highlights piece, a graphical rundown banner for the current and succeeding highlight segments (similar to that seen on FSN Final Score) was added on-screen. Originally, the second segment featured several field reports from the day's games, additional analysis, and inside information about the NFL from Peter King.

===== Reworked format =====
The field report segment was eventually eliminated, while field reports on the program were reduced, supposedly due to cutbacks at NBC Universal. The second segment began featuring an interview conducted earlier in the week, usually by Bob Costas.

In the third segment, the studio team moved to a screening room, in which highlights of the daytime games were reviewed. Football Night in America is the only pre-game show that the NFL allows to carry long-form highlights (running up to three minutes, twice as long as the usual allowance). Because of Game 2 of the 2006 World Series, and the preference that no NFL game competes against the Major League Baseball championship series, a one-hour edition aired from 7:00 to 8:00 p.m. on October 22. Additionally, as the NFL spurned Christmas Eve contests (a policy that was revoked in 2007), another one-hour show aired on December 24.

NBC had chosen one game per week to focus on as well. For this game, usually the marquee late matchup on either Fox or CBS, NBC will send one of its reporters to cover the game in a more in-depth fashion (as ESPN does for Sunday NFL Countdown). Starting in 2014, the on-site role was primarily filled by Kathryn Tappen. Previously, reports were filed by Carolyn Manno and Alex Flanagan (the latter left NBC Sports after the 2014 season). The on-site reporting role had been a rotating one, with reports being filed by Manno, Tappen, Paul Burmeister (who came over from NFL Network in 2015 to replace the departed Alex Flanagan), and Heather Cox (who came over from ESPN, alongside current host Mike Tirico, for NBC's coverage of Thursday Night Football in 2016). An exception came during Week 16 of 2016, where NBC produced two games on Christmas Day, the first one being Ravens-Steelers (which was on NFL Network, labeled as an "NFL Network Special"), the other being Broncos-Chiefs, which was on NBC. Because of that, the usual "focus game report" came from Tirico, Tony Dungy, and Cox, who called the game alongside Doug Flutie.

====== Hyundai Sunday Night Kickoff ======
Hyundai Sunday Night Kickoff (previously sponsored by Chevrolet in 2006 and 2007, GMC in 2008, Kia from 2014 to 2017 and Hyundai from 2009 to 2013 and since 2018) is the broadcast's closing segment featuring analysis of the upcoming Sunday Night Football game, which follows immediately afterward, aired shortly before 8:00 p.m. Eastern Time. The segment features Al Michaels and Cris Collinsworth (with John Madden appearing on the segment prior to Madden's retirement from broadcasting in 2009.)

==== 2007 ====
Some major changes went into effect for the 2007 season. In addition, to Michaels and Madden appearing in the first segment, Tiki Barber – who was added to the program – was brought in during the second segment to help provide analysis. Starting in the third portion of the program, Costas and Olbermann take turns reading the game highlights, while Barber, Collinsworth and Bettis were isolated in the "players' room" on another part of the set. After each set of highlights, the analysts comment on the events shown. Peter King also appears during the segment from a location on the main set. For the last 30 minutes of each edition, Collinsworth emerges from the room to join Costas by the large monitor on the set for highlights and analysis of two pre-selected "marquee matchups" (in Week 1, for example, these were the New England Patriots at New York Jets and the Chicago Bears at San Diego Chargers). At the end of the show, the panelists reunite for a one-sentence summary before kickoff.

The roundtable segments and screening room were eliminated from the broadcasts. However, interviews continue to be run on occasion; such as on the September 23 edition, in which Costas spoke with Chicago Bears star Devin Hester. Two features were added: the "TKO Report" ("TKO" being an acronym for "The Keith Olbermann"), a mini-commentary by Olbermann on a topic related to the game; and "Monday Morning Headlines," which summarizes the big stories of the NFL's afternoon action, as determined by the panel.

An abbreviated version was shown at halftime, with Olbermann presenting a new segment called "Worst Person in the NFL," modeled after his "Worst Person in the World" commentary segment on MSNBC's Countdown with Keith Olbermann. His first "honoree" was himself, for advocating a light prison sentence for Michael Vick on his August 26 debut during a preseason game (the following day, Vick pleaded guilty on charges of dogfighting). On the regular season debut, Olbermann pilloried New York Jets fans for cheering as Chad Pennington limped off the field with an ankle injury.

On September 16, NFL commissioner Roger Goodell appeared live on Football Night to discuss the videotape scandal that enveloped the New England Patriots and their head coach Bill Belichick. In the interview, Goodell revealed that the Patriots were asked to turn over all videotape and still photography from previous games and that the team could face further punishment than what had been announced. Olbermann missed this program due an emergency appendectomy, however he returned the following week (September 24).

A one-hour edition of the program aired on October 28, as the NFL decided not to schedule a game that night to avoid scheduling conflicts with Game 4 of the 2007 World Series, which played that evening (and turned out to be the last game of the MLB season as the Boston Red Sox completed its sweep of the Colorado Rockies).

==== 2008 ====
On July 7, 2008, it was announced that former ESPN and ABC commentator Dan Patrick would join NBC Sports and serve as a co-host on Football Night in America. The move reunited Patrick and Olbermann on television for the first time since their days on ESPN's SportsCenter. The highlights package at the end of the program, originally known as "Olbertime", was also revamped under the new segment title "The Little Big Show," a reference to the duo's nickname during their time on SportsCenter. Olbermann quipped, "We tried 'Sportycenter', but that didn't work out." As had occurred during the previous two years, a one-hour edition aired on October 26 from 7:00 to 8:00 p.m. due to scheduling issues with Game 4 of the 2008 World Series that resulted the NFL deciding, when the 2008 schedule was released earlier that year, not to schedule a game for that night.

At first, the reunion of Patrick and Olbermann was the only change from the year before. However, in November 2008, NBC released Bettis and Barber from the studio and effectively discontinued the "players' lounge" set. Barber spent the rest of the season as a field reporter, and held those duties for the NFC Wild Card game between the Atlanta Falcons and the Arizona Cardinals on January 3, 2009. Bettis bounced around between Rockefeller Center and select game sites. Bettis appeared in-studio for Football Night for the 2008 Wild Card Saturday matchups. During the 2008–09 playoffs, Matt Millen, who had been fired earlier in the season after roughly eight years as general manager of the Detroit Lions, joined the Football Night in America team as a studio analyst.

===== Super Bowl XLIII =====
Since NBC held the national television rights to Super Bowl XLIII that year, a five-hour edition of the pre-game show aired starting at 1:00 p.m. Eastern Time on February 1, 2009. Bob Costas anchored the pre-game, halftime and post-game shows, with Cris Collinsworth as co-host and lead studio analyst. On the main set were recently retired coaches Mike Holmgren and Tony Dungy, along with former Lions executive Matt Millen. Dan Patrick and Keith Olbermann hosted segments on an auxiliary set outside the stadium and on the field and in the locker room (standing up) with Football Night regulars Jerome Bettis and Tiki Barber, as well as guest analyst Rodney Harrison. Andrea Kremer and Alex Flanagan respectively filed reports on the Steelers and Cardinals; Patrick handled the Super Bowl presentation.

==== 2009 ====
When the 2009 season of the program kicked off on September 13, Cris Collinsworth replaced John Madden as a color commentator, alongside Michaels following Madden's retirement. Bettis' contract was not renewed; Tony Dungy and Rodney Harrison replaced Collinsworth and Bettis as full-time studio analysts, while Barber served as an on-site reporter.

On August 26, NBC announced that Football Night host Bob Costas would host the pre-game show at the game site; pregame panelists Dan Patrick, Keith Olbermann, Dungy and Harrison would remain in the New York City studio.

=== 2010s ===
==== 2010 ====
The basic format remained unchanged from the previous year; all commentators remained except for Olbermann, who remained with MSNBC until his dismissal and move to Current TV (later Al Jazeera America) the following year.

The December 26 edition of the program aired for 90 minutes, with Costas hosting from Lincoln Financial Field despite the postponement of that night's Minnesota Vikings-Philadelphia Eagles game to December 28 due to a blizzard that hit the area a few days earlier. A short five-minute pre-game show aired on that night preceding the game, however the usual Sunday Night Football introduction by Faith Hill did not air.

==== 2011 ====
The format remained virtually unchanged as all commentators returned to the show from the previous season.

===== Super Bowl XLVI =====
On February 6, 2012, NBC aired a five-hour Super Bowl XLVI pre-game telecast starting at 1:00 p.m. Eastern Time, hosted by Bob Costas and Dan Patrick, who also emceed the halftime and post-game shows; Tony Dungy and Rodney Harrison served as the co-hosts and lead studio analysts. Active NFL players Aaron Rodgers and Hines Ward contributed as guest analysts exclusively on the pre-game show. Costas hosted segments on an auxiliary set outside the stadium and on-field; Patrick hosted segments from the stadium concourse on an additional auxiliary. Michele Tafoya filed respective reports on the New York Giants and New England Patriots, while Patrick handled the Super Bowl trophy presentation.

==== 2012 ====
The format remained virtually unchanged as all commentators returned to the show from the previous season.

==== 2013 ====
With Studio 8G being prepped to become the home for Seth Meyers' version of Late Night, production of Football Night in America moved to Studio 8H at 30 Rockefeller Plaza, the studio in which Saturday Night Live also broadcasts. Earlier that year, in March, NBC Sports' operations and all other studio programs moved from the network's New York City headquarters to a new facility in Stamford, Connecticut.

==== 2014 ====
Football Night in America joined the other NBC Sports studio programs at the new NBC Sports Headquarters in Stamford, where an entirely new set for the program was introduced with the debut of the program's ninth season on September 7, 2014, replacing the original set that had been used since the program's 2006 debut. In addition, Kia Motors replaced Hyundai (both automakers are owned by Hyundai Motor Group) as the sponsor for the program's Sunday Night Kickoff segment. Then-recently added NBC Sports correspondent Josh Elliott (formerly of ESPN and later, ABC's Good Morning America) also joined the FNIA broadcast team that year. Elliott would leave NBC Sports to join the network's sister news division in March of the following year.

===== Super Bowl XLIX =====
On February 1, 2015, NBC aired a five-hour Super Bowl XLIX pre-game telecast starting at 1:00 p.m. ET, hosted by Bob Costas and Dan Patrick, who also emceed the halftime and post-game shows; Tony Dungy and Rodney Harrison once again served as the co-hosts and lead studio analysts, along with guest analyst John Harbaugh.

==== 2015 ====
The "4 Downs" segment was added as the final segment of FNIA before ending with Costas at the game site.

==== 2016 ====
Other than Mike Tirico joining FNIA to alternate pregame hosting duties with Bob Costas at the SNF game site, the format remained virtually unchanged as all commentators returned to the show from the previous season.

==== 2017 ====
Mike Tirico became the new host of the program from the SNF game site, replacing Bob Costas. Also, the format remained virtually unchanged as all of the other in-studio commentators (Patrick, Harrison and Dungy) returned from the previous season.

===== Super Bowl LII =====
On February 4, 2018, NBC aired a six-hour pregame show from Minneapolis, the host city of Super Bowl LII, starting at noon ET (11am CT), hosted by Patrick, Dungy and Harrison, the latter two also served as lead analysts. Liam McHugh, who had previously hosted the NBC-produced Thursday Night Football pregame show during parts of the 2017 NFL season, filled in for Tirico at the game site while the latter was in PyeongChang, South Korea preparing for the network's Winter Olympics coverage (which began just four nights later, on February 8, 2018). Patrick also hosted the halftime and postgame shows.

==== 2018 ====
For the 2018 season, Mike Tirico succeeded Dan Patrick as lead studio host for the show. Tirico is joined in studio by returning analysts Rodney Harrison and Tony Dungy. Liam McHugh took over Tirico's previous role at the SNF game site. The show now ends with Sunday Night Football game picks by Tirico, Harrison, Dungy, Florio, and Chris Simms. McHugh also makes a pick, however, because he is at the game site, Tirico announces his pick for him.

==== 2019 ====
The format remained virtually unchanged as all of the in-studio commentators returned from the previous season. However, the only significant change from the previous season is that Liam McHugh now makes his game pick on camera from the game site.

=== 2020s ===
==== 2020 ====
The format remained virtually unchanged as all of the commentators, including McHugh at the SNF game site, returned from the previous season. Joining the team was Collinsworth's son Jac, who had been with ESPN's Sunday NFL Countdown. Jac Collinsworth serves as a substitute host from the stadium, generally when McHugh fills in for Tirico at Stamford or has other commitments such as the 2020 Stanley Cup playoffs. Mike Florio started working exclusively from home, from the studio where he films PFT Live on weekdays. Also making his debut in December was MSNBC political analyst Steve Kornacki, who examined playoff scenarios in a manner similar to his coverage of the 2020 United States presidential election.

==== 2021 ====
There were several major staff changes that were put in place for the 2021 NFL season. Jac Collinsworth replaced the departed Liam McHugh, who left to join Turner Sports and anchor their NHL coverage, as an on-site host and analyst Rodney Harrison was moved to the game site as well. Former New Orleans Saints quarterback Drew Brees took over Harrison's previous role as an in-studio analyst. Additionally, Maria Taylor (formerly of ESPN/ABC) joined Mike Tirico, Tony Dungy, Brees, and Chris Simms in the network's Stamford, Connecticut facility. Florio remains at his facility at home.

===== Super Bowl LVI =====
NBC's five-hour pregame coverage for Super Bowl LVI began at 1 ET, on February 13, the latest date for a Super Bowl.

Rather than staying put with the Winter Olympics, NBC announced that Tirico would host both events. Tirico started in Beijing, then flew back to the U.S. and Los Angeles, to host from the game site, SoFi Stadium. Tirico, who also presided the Lombardi Trophy presentation, hosted on the main set with Dungy and Brees, outside SoFi. Taylor, making her NBC Super Bowl debut, hosted on the famous Santa Monica Pier with Simms, while Collinsworth, also making his NBC Super Bowl debut, hosted inside the stadium with Harrison. For the first time all season, Florio joined the crew on the road.

==== 2022 ====
With Tirico succeeding Michaels as lead play-by-play announcer, it was announced that Maria Taylor would become the new main host of the program. Former Dallas Cowboys head coach Jason Garrett also joined to replace Brees, who left after only one year with NBC. Florio continued to appear from home, but made several appearances in-studio and on the road during the season.

==== 2023 ====
2023 saw few changes to the pregame show. Former New England Patriots safety Devin McCourty joined this season and was added to the studio set, replacing Dungy, who was reassigned to the on-site crew with Jac Collinsworth and Harrison. From Week 16 to the Divisional round, Ahmed Fareed took over as host due to Taylor going on maternity leave. Florio also made a full-time return to the studio this season.

==== 2024 ====
After missing the final 3 weeks of the previous season as well as the previous year's postseason due to maternity leave, Maria Taylor returned for her third year as host of FNIA.

==== 2026 ====
In March 2026, Tony Dungy announced that he would leave FNIA. On April 26, 2026, during NBA Showtime, Taylor announced that former Pittsburgh Steelers head coach Mike Tomlin would join the panel for the 2026 season, and that the program would now be broadcast from the site of each game throughout the season (rather than only selected weeks). The next day, Chris Simms announced that he would also depart FNIA.

== Wild Card Weekend ==
Prior to the Wild Card Saturday doubleheader, a half-hour version of Football Night in America is broadcast featuring an in-depth preview of the first game; during the afternoon halftime, a special edition of the Sunday Night Football halftime show is also broadcast. After the conclusion of the afternoon game and before the kickoff of the night game, an edition known in 2007 as the Diet Pepsi Bridge Show aired.

At that point, the format became very similar to the traditional Football Night in America broadcasts, with Faith Hill singing a special playoff version of the intro, Al Michaels and John Madden working the booth, and Keith Olbermann doing a segment during halftime. In addition, until Madden's 2009 retirement, a "Horse Trailer Player of the Game" was named awarding the MVP for the nighttime game. In 2009, the Wild Card edition of the pre-game was retitled the NFL on NBC Studio Show.

=== 2000s ===
==== 2006–2008 seasons ====
For the 2006 Wild Card coverage, Jim L. Mora appeared as co-host in place of Cris Collinsworth. In 2007, Miami Dolphins player Jason Taylor filled in for Collinsworth in the player's room, as Collinsworth was in Seattle, serving as a commentator for the afternoon game with Tom Hammond. Matt Millen made his first public appearance in Collinsworth's seat for the network's 2008 Wild Card coverage, after being fired by the Detroit Lions. Barber did not appear as he was assigned as the sideline reporter for the early game.

==== 2011 season ====
Bob Costas hosted the pre-game from New Orleans, while Charles Barkley – who was at 30 Rock to host that evening's episode of Saturday Night Live, which taped next door at Studio 8H – sat in with Patrick, Dungy and Harrison in New York City.

==== 2014–2019 seasons ====
NBC renegotiated its contract with the NFL following the 2013 season and ceded one of its two Wild Card Saturday playoff games in order to obtain rights to one of the Saturday playoff games in the Divisional Playoffs. This guarantees NBC at least two games per playoff year, with the network airing a wild card matchup, and a second round playoff game which alternates conferences each year.

These playoff games under the 2014 contract have aired at 1:00 pm EST, 4:30 pm EST, and NBC's usual 8:30 pm EST.

However beginning with the 2016-17 NFL playoffs, 1:00 pm playoff games have been eliminated by the league (except for Sundays), at first nominally due to weather, but announced as permanent a week later.

==== 2020 and beyond ====
With NBC gaining an extra Wild Card game in 2021, which they also streamed on Peacock, NBC had two Wild Card games for the first time since 2014. With that, two editions of Football Night aired before both games, with Liam McHugh taking over Mike Tirico's spot for both nights. Tirico was assigned to the Saturday night game, along with Tony Dungy and Kathryn Tappen, which he worked from home due to COVID-19 protocols. Jac Collinsworth, son of Cris Collinsworth took over McHugh's spot on site in Landover and Pittsburgh for both nights, with Rodney Harrison joining him in Pittsburgh for the Sunday night game, as Dungy returned to the studio after the Saturday game. Tirico returned to the studio the next week.

For the 2022 playoffs, NBC's studio coverage totally changed. With McHugh leaving NBC to join Turner Sports, who along with ESPN and ABC, picked up the NHL's media rights from NBC after 16 years, and anchor their NHL coverage, Maria Taylor took Tirico's spot as studio host, as the latter was calling the Saturday game, along with Drew Brees. Because Brees was also calling the game, Chris Simms moved to the main desk with Taylor and Dungy. Collinsworth and Harrison continued to contribute from the game site, with Brees joining the two for the Sunday game. Tirico, Brees, Taylor, and Simms all returned to their usual positions for Divisional Weekend and Super Bowl LVI.

For 2023, the only change was Dungy, who replaced Brees as the analyst for the Chargers-Jaguars game, alongside Amazon's Al Michaels and Kaylee Hartung. Simms joined Taylor and Garrett on the desk for Super Wild Card Weekend. Dungy then joined Collinsworth and Harrison in Cincinnati the next night. The FNIA crew later went on the road for Divisional Weekend.

For 2024, Garrett was the only change for the main desk. Because Garrett called the Dolphins-Chiefs game on Peacock, alongside Tirico (who replaced Michaels amidst continuous criticism over lack of enthusiasm during Amazon's Thursday Night Football games and comments made about Chiefs tight end Travis Kelce's girlfriend, Taylor Swift) and Hartung. Garrett returned to the studio the next night, joining Ahmed Fareed, who replaced Taylor while the latter was on maternity leave, Simms, and Devin McCourty, who joined FNIA that season. Collinsworth, Dungy, and Harrison reported live from Kansas City on Saturday and Detroit on Sunday. The rest of the FNIA crew joined Collinsworth, Dungy, and Harrison in Detroit for Divisional Weekend.

== Theme music ==
Starting in 2018, NBC implemented an opening, similar to the opening that kicks off SNF. The song used is "Check it Out" by Oh the Larceny. The open features NFL players like: the Vikings' Stefon Diggs and Anthony Barr, the Cowboys' Dak Prescott, the Rams' Todd Gurley and Jared Goff, the Falcons' Julio Jones, and the Seahawks' Russell Wilson. Some of the players' actions during the open were taken from when NBC had a share of Thursday Night Football In 2016 and 2017. The theme was retained for 2019 with new players being added like Baker Mayfield of the Browns.

== Thursday night games ==
Football Night in America was also used as the pre-game show for NBC-produced Thursday Night Football games in 2016 and 2017, though with a slightly varying format due to it being that week's first game, and America in the title substituted with the name of the host city/region of that night's game (A Vikings home game would have that edition of the pre-game titled Football Night in Minnesota, for instance).

== Personalities ==
For the program's inaugural season in 2006, Bob Costas served as the host, with Cris Collinsworth, Sterling Sharpe and Jerome Bettis as analysts, and Sports Illustrated columnist Peter King as the special "insider" reporter. On September 7, 2006, Jerome Bettis arrived on the exterior set in a school bus (a reference to his nickname as a player for the Pittsburgh Steelers, "The Bus"); that night, in addition to providing analysis, Bettis received his ring for winning Super Bowl XL. Bettis missed the December 3 broadcast to prepare for the funeral of his father, Johnnie, who had died of a heart attack the previous Tuesday. NFL Network analyst Marshall Faulk (who at the time was technically still an active player in the NFL, although the St. Louis Rams eventually cut him after a series of injuries) substituted for Bettis that week.

At the end of the 2006 season, Sharpe's contract was apparently terminated, and former New York Giants running back Tiki Barber replaced him in 2007. Keith Olbermann, then host of MSNBC's Countdown, was named as another co-host. In addition, Costas and Collinsworth hosted the halftime show for the Georgia Tech–Notre Dame game on September 1, 2007; this turned out to be a one-shot promotional appearance.

=== Current ===
- Maria Taylor – co-host (2021), main host (2022–present)
- Jason Garrett – analyst (2022–present); fill-in color commentary (2022–present)
- Devin McCourty – analyst (2023–present)
- Mike Tomlin – analyst (2026–present)
- Mike Florio – NFL insider (2010–present)
- Steve Kornacki – analytics (2020–present)

=== Former ===
==== Hosts ====
- Bob Costas – studio host (2006–2008), on-site host (2009–2016), contributor (2017)
- Keith Olbermann – studio co-host (2007–2010)
- Dan Patrick - studio host (2008–2017)
- Mike Tirico – fill in on-site host/fill in play-by-play (2016), on–site host (2017), studio host/fill-in play-by-play (2018–2021)
- Liam McHugh – fill-in studio host (2016, 2020), fill-in on-site host (2017), on–site host (2018–2020)
- Kathryn Tappen – fill-in host (2020–2022)
- Jac Collinsworth – host (2020–2025)
- Ahmed Fareed - fill-in host (2020; 2022–2023)

==== Analysts ====
- Cris Collinsworth – studio analyst (2006–2009)
- Jerome Bettis – studio analyst (2006–2009)
- Sterling Sharpe – studio analyst (2006)
- Tiki Barber – studio analyst (2007–2009), on-site reporter (2009–2010)
- Hines Ward – on-site analyst (2012–2015)
- Drew Brees - studio analyst/fill-in game analyst (2021)
- Tony Dungy – studio analyst (2009–2022), on-site analyst (2023–2025)
- Rodney Harrison – studio analyst (2009–2020), on-site analyst (2021-2025)
- Chris Simms – analyst (2017–2025)

==== Contributors ====
- Peter King – NFL insider/contributor (2006–2016); part-time contributor (2022–2024)
- Scott Pioli – contributor (2013)
- Josh Elliott – contributor (2014)
- Matthew Berry – fantasy football/sports betting expert (2022–2025)

== Nielsen ratings ==
For the 2013 season (from September 23 to December 15, 2013), Football Night in America averaged 4.123 million viewers between 7:00 and 7:29 p.m. Eastern Time; 4.960 million between 7:30 and 7:58 p.m. Eastern and 11.677 million between 8:00 and 8:22 p.m. Eastern.

The November 2, 2014, broadcast averaged 3.408 million viewers between 7:30 and 7:58 p.m. Eastern Time, and 10.124 million viewers between 7:59 to 8:22 p.m. Eastern.

== See also ==
- The NFL on NBC pregame show
