= Jac Collinsworth =

American sportscaster (born 1995)

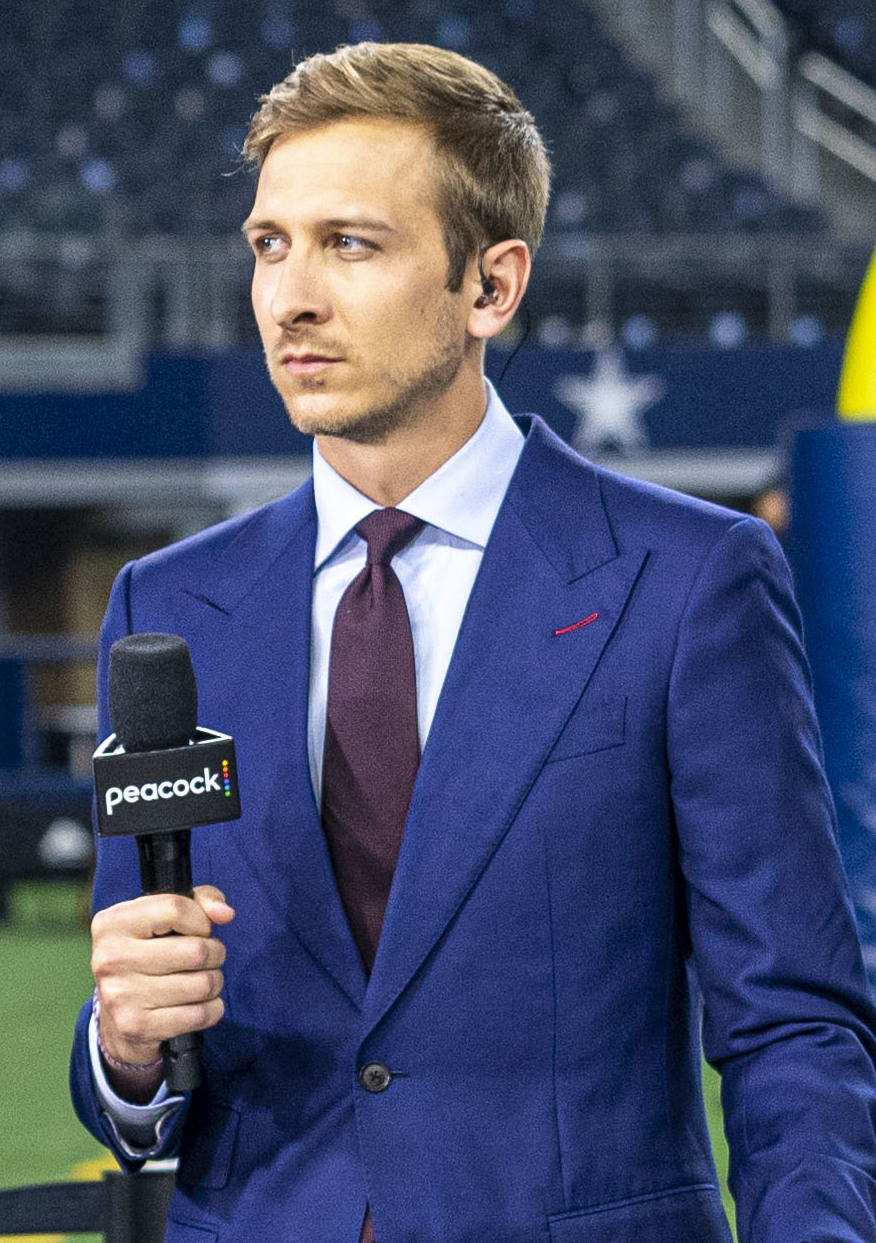
- Collinsworth in 2021
- Born: February 13, 1995 (age 31); Fort Thomas, Kentucky, U.S.
- Education: University of Notre Dame
- Occupation: Sportscaster
- Years active: 2013–present
- Employer(s): ESPN (2017–2020); Comcast (2013–2017, 2020–present)
- Television: ESPN/ABC (2017–2020); NBC Sports (2013–2017, 2020–present)

Jac Collinsworth (born February 13, 1995) is an American sportscaster working for NBC Sports since 2020. He also worked for ESPN on their NFL Live and Sunday NFL Countdown. At NBC, Collinsworth serves as a play-by-play announcer for Big Ten and Atlantic 10 Conference men's basketball.

He previously was a play-by-play announcer for the USFL on NBC and Notre Dame Football on NBC.

== Early life and education ==
Collinsworth was born in Fort Thomas, Kentucky, on February 13, 1995. He is the son of former NFL wide receiver and current NBC Sports commentator Cris Collinsworth. Collinsworth attended Highlands High School and played on the football team. However, a back injury sidetracked him from playing football in college.

As a high school student, Collinsworth first got involved with broadcasting by recording, editing and producing videos. Collinsworth attended the University of Notre Dame, graduating in 2017. While a student there, he founded and hosted ND Live, a digital series covering the Notre Dame football team. He also covered Notre Dame's pro day for NFL Network in 2016 and 2017.

== Career ==
=== First stint at NBC (2013–2017) ===
As a student at Notre Dame, Collinsworth worked for NBC on their sideline production team for Notre Dame football from 2013 until 2017. In 2016 and 2017, he served as a sideline reporter for NBC's production of Notre Dame's Blue-Gold spring football game. Collinsworth served as NBC's social media correspondent at the 2016 Rio Olympics.

=== ESPN (2017–2020) ===
Following his work at NBC while a student at Notre Dame, Collinsworth began working at ESPN in 2017. He started off as a features reporter for Sunday NFL Countdown and in 2018 started hosting NFL Live during the NFL offseason. He also hosted the ACC Network's premier football show The Huddle.

=== Second stint at NBC (2020–present) ===
After three years at ESPN, Collinsworth returned to NBC in 2020. At NBC, Collinsworth served as the on-site host of Football Night in America. He served as the host for the pre and post-game show for Notre Dame Football on NBC. Collinsworth is also a pre and post-race studio host for NASCAR on NBC. He serves as the play-by-play announcer for Atlantic 10 Conference men's basketball and is the voice of the Atlantic 10 men's basketball tournament.

In 2021, Collinsworth served as a reporter for NBC's coverage of the Kentucky Derby, pre-race host of the Indianapolis 500 and an on-site contributor for the 2020 Tokyo Summer Olympics on Peacock.

Collinsworth made his Super Bowl debut in 2022 as the co-host of the Super Bowl LVI Pregame Show. Later that year, Collinsworth served as a play-by-play announcer for NBC's coverage of the USFL. Additionally, Collinsworth was promoted to be the play-by-play voice of Notre Dame football for the 2022 season, and added Big Ten football duties for the 2023 season. He was replaced by Dan Hicks prior to the 2024 season, but continued to call select Big Ten football games.

With Peacock adding coverage of Big Ten basketball starting with the 2023–24 season, Collinsworth was selected as one of the conference's play-by-play announcers.
