= Maria Taylor (sportscaster) =

American sportscaster (born 1987)

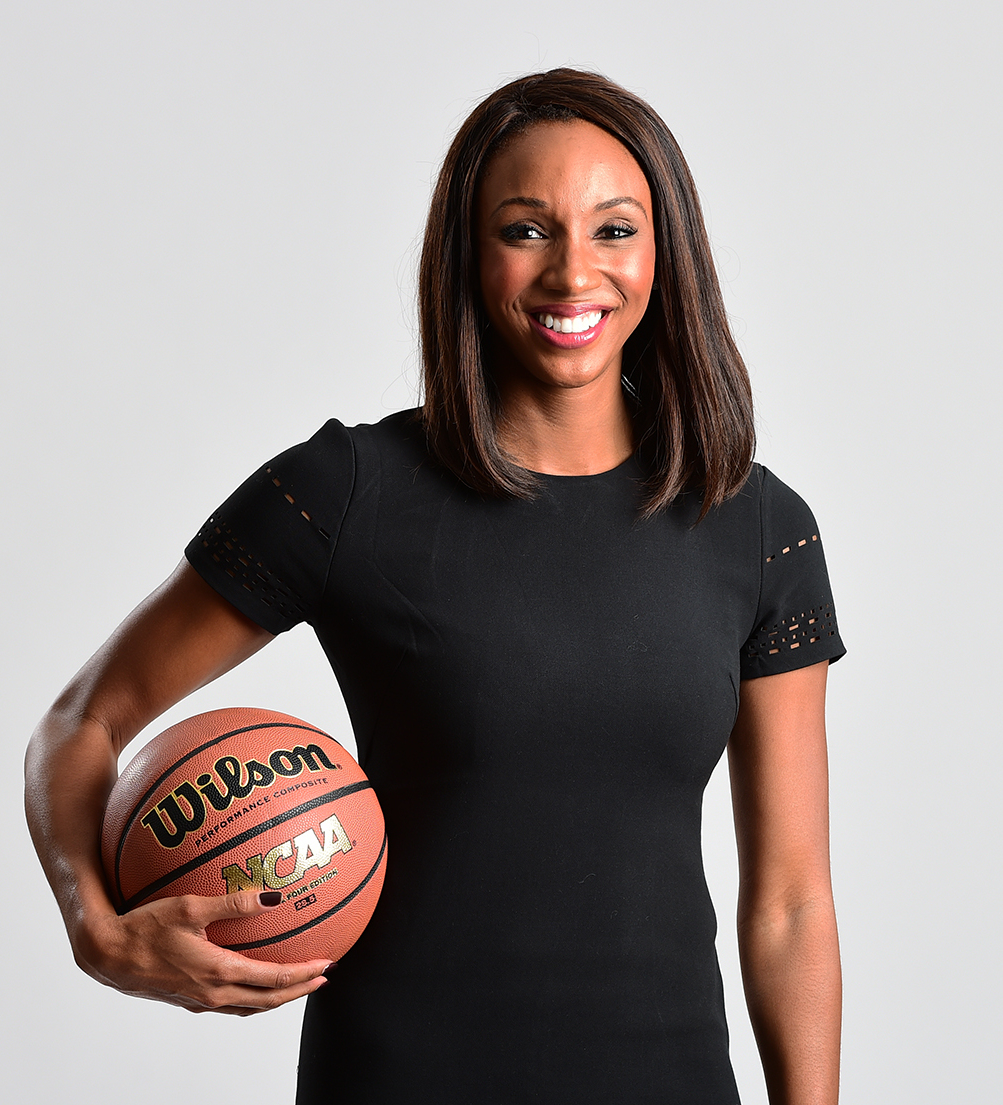
- Taylor in 2015
- Born: Suzette Maria Taylor; May 12, 1987 (age 39); Cookeville, Tennessee, U.S.
- Education: University of Georgia
- Occupation: Sportscaster
- Years active: 2009–present
- Employer: NBC Sports
- Spouses: Rodney Blackstock (m. 2019; div. 2021) Jon Lee Hemphill (m. 2021)
- Children: 1
- Website: mariataylortv.com

Suzette Maria Taylor (born May 12, 1987) is an American sportscaster for NBC Sports. She has worked for ESPN and the SEC Network. She has covered college football, college volleyball, National Basketball Association (NBA), National Football League (NFL), the Olympic Games and men's and women's college basketball.

== Early life and height ==
Taylor was born on May 12, 1987, to Steve and Suzette Taylor. She was born in Cookeville, Tennessee, while her father was a coach at Tennessee Tech University.

She is 6 ft 2 in (1.88 m) tall.

== High school and college athlete ==
While attending Centennial High School in Roswell, Georgia, she had a successful four-year basketball career in which she received many accolades. Among the awards were being a member of the Atlanta Tip-Off Team of the Year, being a Fulton County Scholar Athlete of the Year, Offensive MVP of her high school volleyball team for three years, a three-time All-Region Selection, and being named All-State as a senior. Taylor was additionally selected to be a member of the 2004 USA Volleyball Junior National A2 team.

Taylor received an athletic scholarship to the University of Georgia, where she continued to play volleyball and basketball from 2005 until 2009. While at Georgia she was named a member of the All-SEC volleyball team each season. She also continued to play for the US Volleyball Junior National A2 team, and helped them win a bronze medal during the Open Division of the US Volleyball Championships. By the time her playing days were done in the fall of 2008, Taylor ranked fourth all-time in program history in career kills with 1,729 and was fourth all-time in total points with 2,020.

== Career ==
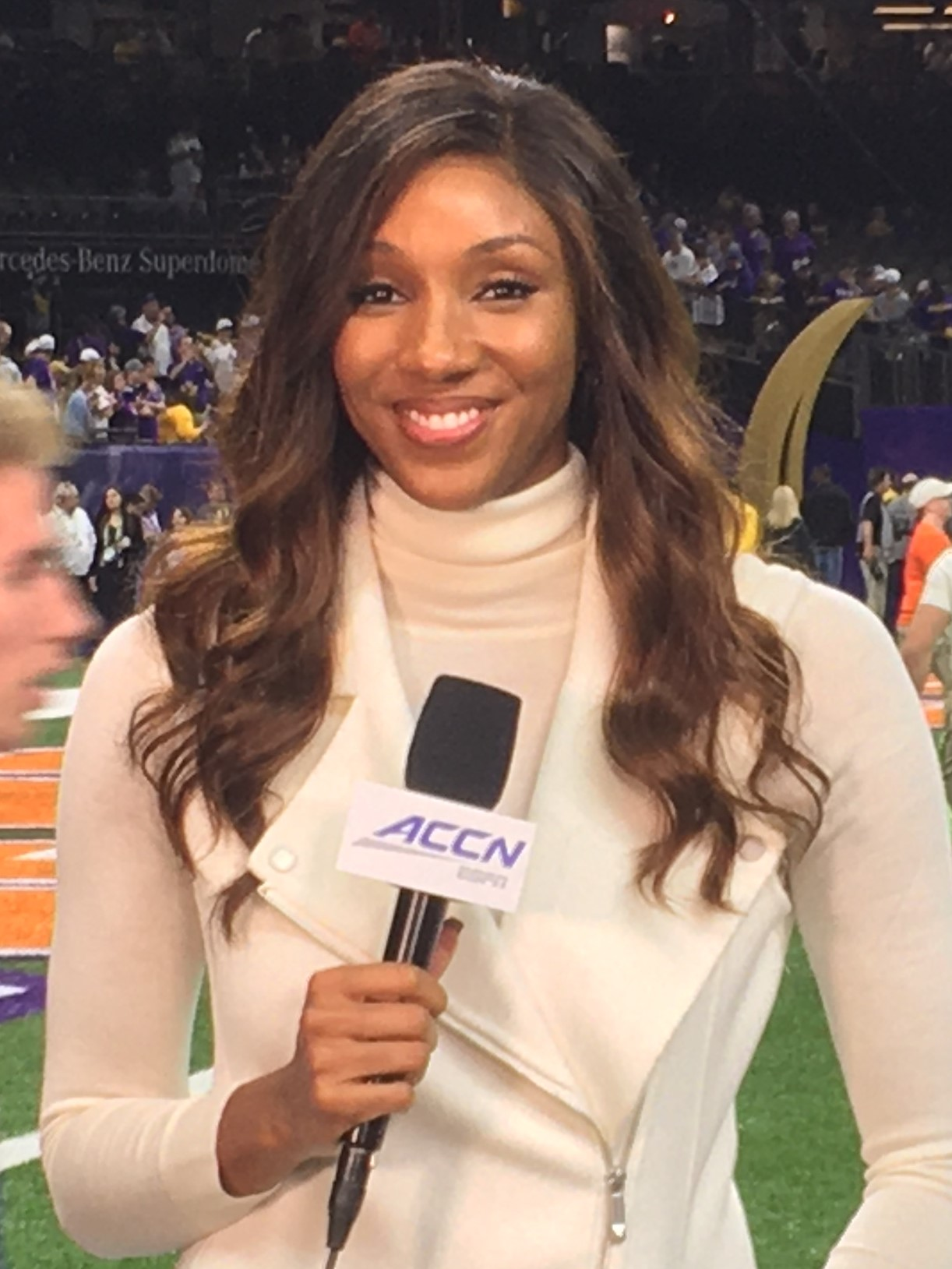
Taylor covering the 2020 College Football Playoff National Championship for ACC Network

Prior to 2012, Taylor was a reporter and host for IMG College at the University of Georgia for three years. She also appeared on various studio shows, including Dawg Report, SEC Men's Basketball Tonight, and SportsNite.

=== ESPN ===
In 2013, Taylor was the sideline reporter on ESPN2’s weekly Saturday-night primetime college football telecast in addition to the Orange Bowl, her second straight year covering the annual bowl game. She has been an analyst on the NCAA Women's Basketball Selection Show, NCAA Women's Basketball Tournament Preview Show and also ESPN's coverage of both the NCAA Women's Basketball Tournament and Women's Volleyball National Championship for the previous two years.

Taylor joined the SEC Network in 2014. She was a college football reporter on SEC Network with commentator Brent Musburger and Jesse Palmer, and was also an analyst on other SEC telecasts including volleyball and women's basketball. Additionally, she provided sideline coverage for the 2016 Rose Bowl Game between Stanford University and the University of Iowa. In 2017, Maria joined the College GameDay broadcast team as reporter and host, replacing Samantha Ponder (who became the host of Sunday NFL Countdown), and was an ESPN host and reporter for the College Football Playoff between the University of Georgia and the University of Oklahoma. Subsequently, she was a host and reporter for the 2018 College Football Playoff National Championship between the University of Alabama and the University of Georgia. Taylor was the sideline reporter for Saturday Night Football on ABC, with Chris Fowler and Kirk Herbstreit calling the game from the booth.

In 2019, Taylor began hosting NBA Countdown, the pre-game show for ESPN's Friday night and Sunday afternoon NBA games. Amid the COVID-19 pandemic in 2020, ESPN scrapped its original plan for The Jump, hosted by Rachel Nichols, to serve as the NBA Finals pregame show, and instead named Taylor's NBA Countdown the Finals pregame and halftime show. In 2020, she was the sideline reporter for Pittsburgh Steelers vs New York Giants Monday Night Football opener.

=== NBC Sports ===
In 2020, ESPN reportedly offered to increase Taylor's $1 million annual salary to $5 million, which she turned down. Taylor left the network the day after the 2021 NBA Finals concluded on July 20. Her departure came after a conference call between Rachel Nichols and LeBron James's advisor Adam Mendelsohn from July 2020 that suggested that the network’s decision to choose Taylor to host the NBA Finals was due to her race was leaked earlier that month. Two days later, Taylor joined NBC Sports, and made her on-air debut for the network during coverage of the 2020 Summer Olympics on July 23, 2021.

In the 2021 NFL season, Taylor joined NBC's Sunday Night Football pre-game show Football Night in America as a panelist. In May 2022, it was announced that Taylor would replace Mike Tirico (who was moving to the lead play-by-play position for Sunday Night Football) as the lead host of the program. Taylor served as the host for the men's and women's semi-finals and finals during NBC's coverage of the 2022 French Open. In addition to Football Night in America, since 2023, Taylor has also served as host for NBC's college football coverage, serving in the role during Big Ten and Notre Dame games.

For the 2024 Summer Olympics, Taylor was named a host again by NBC, taking responsibilities for the NBC Late Night Weekend recap segments as well as the nightly prime time NBC Olympic Zone.

In 2025, Taylor was named the lead studio host for NBC's returning NBA and WNBA coverage. She is expected to work Tuesday and Sunday night NBA games, while also hosting select WNBA games during the season. Due to the new commitments, she also stepped down as studio host for the network's college football coverage.

In 2026, Taylor became the first African American woman to host a Vince Lombardi Trophy presentation during NBC Sports' presentation of Super Bowl LX.

== Personal life ==
Maria is married to Jonathan Lee Hemphill. They married on February 12, 2021, and welcomed their first child on December 24, 2023, who they named Roman Ryan Taylor Hemphill. They currently reside in Atlanta, Georgia.
