= ProFootballTalk =

American football news and analysis website

- Website type: Sports
- Owner: NBC
- Industry: Sports journalism
- Website: www.nbcsports.com/nfl/profootballtalk
- Commercial: Yes
- Launched: November 1, 2001; 25 years ago
- Current status: Online

ProFootballTalk, often known solely by its acronym PFT, is a website covering news from the National Football League. The site has a blog format with short posts that usually include links to the original source of the news along with some commentary and analysis.

== History ==
The site was created on November 1, 2001, by Mike Florio, who is also the site's primary editor and contributor. As of 2022, primarily site contributors include Florio, Michael David Smith, Josh Alper, Myles Simmons, Charean Williams and Peter King.

On June 14, 2009, it was announced that ProFootballTalk would become an affiliate of NBC Sports, which would hold exclusive rights to PFT content although Florio would retain ownership.

=== PFT Live ===
PFT Live
- Genre: Sports talk
- Running time: 2 hours (7:00 – 9:00 a.m. ET)
- Country of origin: United States
- Language: English
- Home station: NBC Sports Radio (2015–20); NBC Sports Audio (2020–present)
- TV adaptations: NBCSN (2015–20, 2025-present); Peacock (2020–present); NBC Sports NOW (2025–present)
- Starring: Mike Florio; Chris Simms
- Original release: January 5, 2015
- Website: ProFootballTalk.com

PFT Live is an online sports radio show began in 2015. As of 2022, it features Mike Florio and Chris Simms. On August 11, 2020, it was announced that the site will stream exclusively on Peacock on August 24, 2020. As of 2025, the show also airs for free on NBC Sports NOW. On November 13, 2025, It was reported that the show would be simulcasted on the relaunched NBCSN.

== Notable errors ==
ProFootballTalk posted and thus spread the unconfirmed rumor on January 25, 2007 that broadcaster and former Pittsburgh Steelers quarterback Terry Bradshaw had died in a car accident. This proved to be incorrect.

A similar instance occurred on September 14, 2009 when the crew of ProFootballTalk erroneously reported a quote from Keyshawn Johnson in referring to Joe Flacco as a "bum". A correction to this was posted on the September 15.

== See also ==
- PFT Commenter
