= Volleyball offensive systems =

Volleyball terminology

Volleyball offensive systems are the ways in which a coach can personalize and tweak his or her team's offense based on each player's skill level to make the team as competitive as possible. This is done by using different formations that allow a team to use a variety of volleyball attacks. A team on offense will try to increase the probability of winning a point on a hit by confusing the opposing blockers and disguising the setter's intended receiver as much as possible. This is done keeping in mind that the goal is to score a point and that running a successful offense is executed differently for every team. Teams use offensive systems in whatever way suits the team best.

== Preview ==
Volleyball offense is how a team can attempt to score a point by causing the ball to land on the opposing teams side of the court. Generally, this is done by first receiving the ball from the other side in the form of either an attack or serve, having the ball set to an attacker, and then having a player jump and attack the ball. Once the ball is received, the goal is to get the ball where it can be hit most effectively. This is usually close to the net where an attacker can jump and hit the ball. Based on a teams skill level, they will be able to run their offense smoothly with a unique arsenal of attacks and formations.

== Attacks ==
=== Basic ===
The basics sets are used by teams that do not yet have the experience to run more complicated plays. Any more advanced set, relative to the team skill level, should be used sparingly so the opposing block is tricked by thinking the set is merely a basic set.

4: A 4 is a high set to the left antenna where an outside (left front) attacker may hit it.

2: A 2 is a high set to the middle (middle front) attacker about 2 feet above the tape of the net.

5: A 5 is a high set to the right antenna where an opposite (right front) attacker may hit it.

Pipe: A pipe is a high set to the middle back, right behind the 10' line where a back row attacker may hit it.

3: A 3 (also referred to as a 32 or 33) is a shoot set between the outside and middle hitters. Much like a combination of a 1 and a shoot.

1: A 1 (also referred to as a quick) is a low set that is set about 1' above the tape of the net for the middle attacker

=== Advanced ===
These more complicated sets are meant to fool the opposition and get your attacker with 1 blocker or less. At higher levels, teams will use a basic set if it is a last resort, meaning that the ball was received poorly.

Shoot: A shoot or Go-ball is a quick, low set to the left-front hitter near the antenna.
32: A 32 (pronounced three-two) is a set to the left-front hitter halfway in between the middle of the net and the antenna about the height of a two ball.
Flare: A flare is when an attacker uses an inside-out path to attack an outside set. A teammate commonly runs a quick fake to trick the opponents, then the attacker flares out to attack.
Slide: A slide is a set to any attacker who runs parallel to the net and jumps off of one foot.
Iso: An isolation play is a play where you use an attacker, usually the middle, as a decoy to leave another attacker with a weaker opposing block.
Tandem: A tandem is when one attack follows another and hits the ball right after the first one lands, using the first attacker as a decoy.
Double quick: A double quick is when two attackers take an approach towards the setter so that he or she may set either a 1 or a back 1, which is a 1 set over the shoulder of the setter.
X: An x is when a middle goes up for a 1 and the right side attacker comes from the other side to hit a 2, making the two paths of the hitters cross.

== Formations ==
In volleyball, teams must have their players in a specific formation. The players then rotate around the court clockwise whenever the team performs a side-out. There is a penalty for being out of rotation and the opposing team receives a point. There are three formations that are widely used in the sport, each having advantages and disadvantages.

=== 4-2 ===
This offense takes its name from the fact that it uses 4 attackers and two setters. This is a basic formation generally used by less experienced teams to avoid confusion on the court. At any given time, one of the setters is front row and the other is back row. They are always opposite of each other on the court. This allows for 2 attackers front row at any given time, and the setter is able to dump the ball as the setter will always be in the front court. This basic offensive formation allows for any of the basic sets to be run, as well as a 32, shoot, or possibly a tandem. Teams that use a 4-2 will rarely set anything other than the basic sets. The positive aspects of the 4-2 include its simplicity, so a team can gain experience and later move on to a more complicated formation. The negative aspect of using a 4-2 is its limits regarding your offense. Some think that having two setters takes away from your team as the setter is generally the team leader. Some coaches opt to start their team out running a more complicated system and just having the players adopt it.

=== 5-1 ===
A 5-1 takes its name from using 1 setter and having 5 attackers on the court. The secondary setter is replaced by an opposite hitter who is always opposite the setter on the court. This formation allows the setter to be able to dump the ball for half the rotations and have 3 front row attackers to set the ball to on the other three rotations. This system allows the setter to set any possible set he or she wants to depending on whether he or she is front row or back row. Many coaches prefer this system, having one setter as the team leader. It also helps having only one setter so that the setting does not change. One setter may set the ball differently from another giving a different feel for the attackers. It helps when the attackers are used to one setter in particular. The negative points of this offense are that the setter needs to transition from defense to set the ball. This creates situations where the setter has the first contact and someone else has to set the ball.

=== 6-2 ===
A 6-2 is similar to a 4-2, but has 6 attackers and 2 setters. This is possible by having the back row setter always set the ball, making the setter only a hitter when he or she is front row. This formation allows any possible set to be made not including a dump by the setter because he or she is always back row when setting the ball. This formation is good for a team in which the setters are also very good attackers where coach does not want to waste that talent. Some young teams also use it so that the player can increase a broad range of skills and not be sentenced to being a setter for his or her career. Unfortunately, this formation has the problems of 5-1 and 4-2. Having two setters, and always having one of them be back row. The setter always has to transition from defense and the leadership is lacking. Most teams at the highest level, including the USA Olympic team use the 5-1 rather than this for leadership purposes. A 6-2 offense is very common when a team has two setters of equal ability and at a younger age.
