= Chris Simms =

American football player and coach (born 1980)

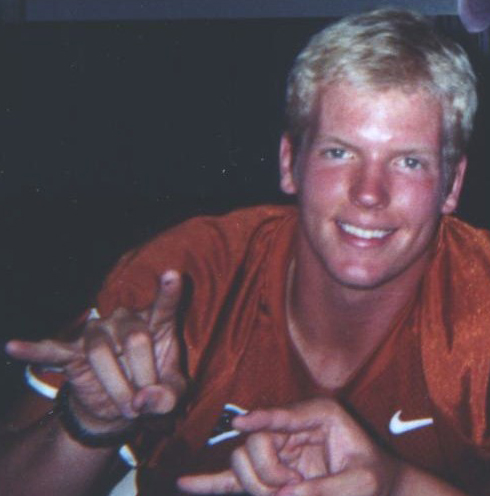
- Simms in 2002

No. 2, 8
- Position: Quarterback

Personal information
- Born: August 29, 1980 (age 46); Franklin Lakes, New Jersey, U.S.
- Listed height: 6 ft 4 in (1.93 m)
- Listed weight: 230 lb (104 kg)

Career information
- High school: Ramapo (Franklin Lakes)
- College: Texas (1999–2002)
- NFL draft: 2003: 3rd round, 97th overall pick

Career history

Playing
- Tampa Bay Buccaneers (2003–2007); Tennessee Titans (2008); Denver Broncos (2009); Tennessee Titans (2010)

Coaching
- New England Patriots (2012) Coaching assistant

Career NFL statistics
- Passing attempts: 511
- Passing completions: 297
- Completion percentage: 58.1%
- TD–INT: 12–18
- Passing yards: 3,117
- Passer rating: 69.1
- Stats at Pro Football Reference

Christopher David Simms (born August 29, 1980) is an American sports analyst and former professional football player who was a quarterback in the National Football League (NFL). He was selected by the Tampa Bay Buccaneers in the third round of the 2003 NFL draft after playing college football for the Texas Longhorns.

Simms also played for the Denver Broncos and the Tennessee Titans. He is the son of former New York Giants quarterback and Super Bowl XXI MVP Phil Simms and the older brother of quarterback Matt Simms.

== Early life ==
Simms grew up in Franklin Lakes, New Jersey and attended Ramapo High School, where he was a standout in both football and basketball. In football, he was a two-time All-State honoree, and was named the 1998 USA Today National Offensive Player of the Year. Simms graduated from Ramapo High School in 1999. After committing to the University of Tennessee during his senior year, Simms decommitted and enrolled at the University of Texas instead.

== College career ==
Simms played college football at the University of Texas at Austin from 1999 to 2002.

He spent his freshman year as the backup to Major Applewhite, and saw limited playing time until the end of the season. Going into the Texas A&M game (the so-called Bonfire Game as it followed the tragic death of 12 students during construction of A&M's annual bonfire), Texas was ranked #5, but right before that game, Applewhite got an intestinal virus that kept him up all night and required him to be put on an IV the next day. As a result, Simms got his first career start and had the Longhorns up 16–6 at halftime. After Simms struggled in the 2nd half, and with Texas still ahead, he was replaced by Applewhite in the 4th quarter, but Applewhite was not able to get Texas any points, they fell behind in the last 6 minutes and Applewhite fumbled on their last possession. Simms took over again during the Cotton Bowl, when Applewhite suffered a knee injury in the 4th quarter.

The next season Applewhite was again the starter, but Simms was more of a co-quarterback than a backup. After Applewhite played poorly in a loss to Stanford in the 2nd game, Simms was given his second career start in the following game against Houston. Simms struggled early and Applewhite got the majority of the snaps in what turned out to be a rout resulting in Applewhite regaining the role as starter. Simms would again get a chance to start when Applewhite suffered a season-ending knee injury on the last drive of the Texas Tech game. Simms played well, throwing for 240 yards or more in each game, including a 383-yard game against #21 Texas A&M, the most ever by a Texas QB against the Aggies. Texas went 2–1 with Simms as quarterback, with the only loss against #8 Oregon, a game Texas could have won – despite Simms setting the record for interceptions in a Holiday Bowl game with 4, but for three dropped touchdown passes on the last drive. Mack Brown was impressed enough to name Simms the starter before the start of spring practice, a decision that proved controversial.

The Longhorns were ranked #5 to start the 2001 season and Simms' play through the first four games was good enough to keep them there. But in the Red River Showdown, Texas faced #3 Oklahoma and Simms' four interceptions, including one in the Sooners' end zone and one that was returned for a touchdown, sealed Oklahoma's victory. Nonetheless, Simms recovered to lead Texas to six straight wins with five straight 200-yard passing games, including a dominating win over #14 Colorado and his second straight win over the Aggies, a #3 ranking, and a rematch against #10 Colorado in the Big 12 Championship Game on December 1. Because of an upset loss by Florida to Tennessee earlier in the day, Texas went into the game knowing that a win would likely put them in the 2002 BCS Championship Game. But Simms had a disastrous game. He was responsible for four turnovers (three interceptions and a fumble) in the first half of play. In the 2nd quarter, after being booed by Texas fans, Simms injured his finger and Applewhite entered the game with Texas down, 29–10. Applewhite led Texas back to within 2 points, but eventually Texas would come up short losing 39–37 after an onside kick attempt failed. Applewhite's strong play, combined with Simms' injury, resulted in Simms sitting out the 2001 Holiday Bowl.

Texas came into the 2002 season with high hopes and a #2 ranking. Simms was the starter all season, and he threw for a career-high 3,207 yards, 2nd to only Applewhite at the time. Texas won its first 5 games and then faced their first challenge against #3 Oklahoma. Texas led in that game until the 4th quarter, when a 3rd Simms interception set up Oklahoma's winning touchdown. Simms and Texas recovered to beat #17 Kansas State and #17 Iowa State in back to back weeks followed by wins over Nebraska and Baylor to climb back up to #3 in the rankings. But the following week, Texas Tech quarterback Kliff Kingsbury threw for 473 yards to upset the Longhorns 42–38, despite Simms playing one of his best games, and scuttle their national championship dreams. Simms capped his year with his 3rd straight victory over Texas A&M and his first bowl win over #25 LSU in the Cotton Bowl. In the Cotton Bowl he threw for 269 yards, 2 touchdowns, and 1 interception – with more than half of those yards going to Cotton Bowl MVP Roy Williams. Simms was named the team's MVP for the season.

He finished with a career record of 26–6, second largest number of wins, at the time, to Bobby Layne. He also played in the 2002 Senior Bowl in which he threw an interception that went for a Senior Bowl record 99-yard return.

== Professional career ==
Pre-draft measurables
Height	Weight	Arm length	Hand span	40-yard dash	10-yard split	20-yard split	20-yard shuttle	Three-cone drill	Vertical jump	Wonderlic
6 ft 4 3/8 in (1.94 m)	220 lb (100 kg)	32 3/4 in (0.83 m)	10 1/2 in (0.27 m)	4.86 s	1.69 s	2.84 s	4.18 s	7.37 s	31.0 in (0.79 m)	22
All values from NFL Combine

=== Tampa Bay Buccaneers ===
==== 2004 ====
Simms was selected with the last pick of the third round in 2003 by the Tampa Bay Buccaneers with the expectation that he would eventually be the successor to Brad Johnson. He was cast third on the Bucs depth chart behind Johnson and former Buccaneers starter Shaun King. Simms sat his entire rookie year without playing a single snap in the regular season.

In 2004, Simms started the season as the 3rd string quarterback again, this time behind Johnson and former Denver Broncos and Miami Dolphins starter Brian Griese, but quickly advanced to backup quarterback after a poor preseason by Griese. Simms saw his first action on September 19, 2004, against the Seattle Seahawks after a below-average performance by Johnson, coming into the game with 10:32 left in the 2nd quarter. Simms went 21–32 with 175 yards and an interception. Simms received his first start two games later against the New Orleans Saints on October 10, 2004, after the Bucs started 0–4 and Johnson was benched for his poor performance. Simms went 5–8 for 75 yards but injured his shoulder early in the game and missed three weeks, allowing Brian Griese to secure the position with three straight wins. Simms saw occasional action as the backup QB to Griese and started a meaningless final game against the Arizona Cardinals where he threw for 224 yards, 1 touchdown and 2 interceptions.

==== 2005 ====
In 2005, Simms was slated on the depth chart as the backup quarterback, behind Brian Griese and ahead of former Cleveland Browns starting quarterback Luke McCown. Simms got his first snap of the season after Miami Dolphins linebacker Zach Thomas was pushed onto Griese's leg with several minutes left in the game on October 16, 2005. Despite the injury, the Buccaneers prevailed 27–13 in the game in which Griese was lost for the season. Simms performed well, completing 6 of 10 passes for 69 yards. Simms got his first start of the season the following week against a weak San Francisco 49ers squad. While Simms had decent numbers (21–34, 264 yards, 1 touchdown, 2 interceptions), his performance was considered poor, as there were many times when he underthrew his receivers, missed open receivers, or incorrectly read the defensive coverage. Simms followed up this performance with about the same performance (25–42, 259 yards, 1 touchdowns, 2 interceptions) against the division rival Carolina Panthers, who were considered a much better team than San Francisco. After these two losses however, Simms performed better than expected and had a knack for late-game heroics. He led fourth-quarter charges against fellow division rival Atlanta twice, as well as the Washington Redskins. The Redskins game was his best performance of the year as Simms threw for three scores as the Buccaneers won 36–35 in a remarkable game. Simms had a much more impressive performance in the rematch against the Carolina Panthers on the road. The two losses in this stretch were against the defending Super Bowl Champion New England Patriots, and the Chicago Bears, who were ranked #1 in the league in total defense, and in both of these games, Simms did not throw any interceptions, but was sacked a combined 11 times. He even led Tampa Bay to another fourth-quarter comeback against the Bears but a 29-yard field goal attempt floated wide right, giving the Bears a 13–10 victory.

Simms led the Buccaneers to their first playoff berth since their Super Bowl victory in the 2002 season. In the rematch vs. the Redskins Simms led Tampa Bay back again from a 17–3 halftime deficit. With the score at 17–10 late in the fourth quarter, Simms hit Edell Shepherd on an apparent 35-yard touchdown strike. However, Shepherd failed to maintain possession as he hit the ground. Tampa Bay lost 17–10 in a game where Washington gained only 120 yards of offense, the lowest total for a playoff winner in NFL history.

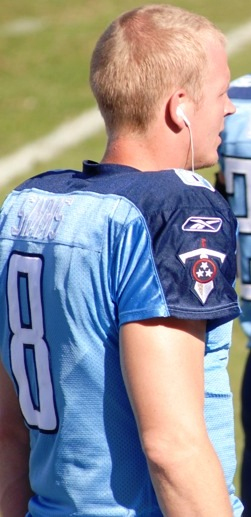
Simms with the Titans in 2008

==== Life-threatening injury ====
Simms suffered a season-ending injury in Game 3 of the 2006 schedule. On Sunday, September 24, he was taken off the field after taking hard hits from the Carolina Panthers defense. Simms returned to the game and even led a successful scoring drive, but remained in physical distress and was taken to a nearby hospital after the game. Tests revealed a ruptured spleen, and Simms immediately underwent emergency surgery. In the aftermath, Simms said he lost five pints of blood before the operation and conceded that another 45 minutes without treatment could have been fatal. Playing on a one-year, $2.1 million contract signed before the season, Simms was eligible for free agency for 2007.

==== 2006–2008 ====
On December 27, 2006, Simms announced that he had signed a two-year extension to remain with the Buccaneers with the expectation that he would start. However, due to complications from his recovery and the performance of Jeff Garcia in mini-camp, Simms was expected to serve as a backup to Garcia. On October 9, Simms was placed on injured reserve for the rest of the season. The Bucs were expected to keep Simms on the roster for mini camp as their fifth quarterback.

Simms' relationship with head coach Jon Gruden worsened significantly during this period. Simms attributed his lack of playing time to how Gruden treated him during his recovery from the spleen injury. He has even said that "The relationship between me and coach Gruden, it’s broken," Simms said. "And I don’t see any way it’s going to get better." Simms also said that he will never forgive Gruden, although he still respects the Buccaneers as an organization.

On August 30, 2008, the Tampa Bay Buccaneers released Simms. He worked out with the Baltimore Ravens during the preseason but was not signed.

=== Tennessee Titans (first stint) ===
Simms signed with the Tennessee Titans on September 9, 2008, after starter Vince Young was sidelined with a sprained MCL. In Young's absence, Simms served as the backup quarterback behind Kerry Collins until October 3, when Simms was released to make room for punter Josh Miller. Simms was re-signed the following week on October 6.

=== Denver Broncos ===
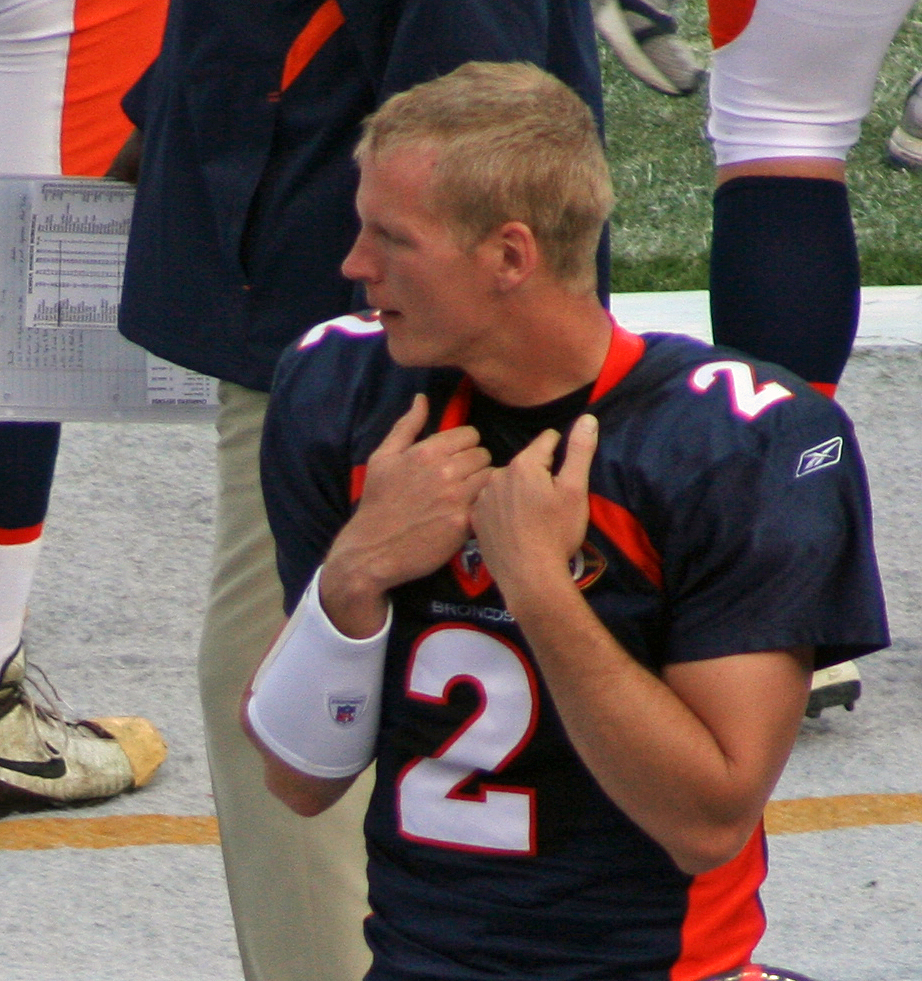
Simms with the Broncos in 2009

On March 4, 2009, Simms signed a two-year, $6 million contract with the Denver Broncos. The deal included a $1.5 million signing bonus and Simms could have earned an additional $3 million through incentives. He was the backup quarterback to Kyle Orton. However, he took over in the second half of a game against the Washington Redskins after Orton left with a sprained ankle, and eventually gave up the lead to the Redskins while going 3–13 passing for 13 yards with no touchdowns and one interception. He started against the San Diego Chargers on November 22, 2009, but was quickly replaced by Orton in the second quarter after going 2 for 4 for only 10 yards. He was released on March 15, 2010, after the Broncos traded for Brady Quinn.

=== Tennessee Titans (second stint) ===
On April 12, 2010, Simms was re-signed by the Titans.

On September 4, 2010, Simms was cut from the Titans roster. On November 22, 2010, he was re-signed to be a backup quarterback behind Rusty Smith, after the season-ending injury to Vince Young. He was not brought back for the 2011 season, nor picked up by another team.

== NFL career statistics ==
Legend
**Bold**	Career high

=== Regular season ===
Year	Team	Games			Passing								Rushing			
Year	Team	GP	GS	Record	Cmp	Att	Pct	Yds	Avg	TD	Int	Rtg	Att	Yds	Avg	TD
2003	TB	0	0	—	DNP											
2004	TB	5	2	1–1	42	73	57.5	467	6.4	1	3	64.1	7	14	**2.0**	0
2005	TB	11	10	**6–4**	**191**	**313**	**61.0**	**2,035**	**6.5**	**10**	**7**	**81.4**	**19**	**31**	1.6	0
2006	TB	3	3	0–3	58	106	54.7	585	5.5	1	**7**	46.3	4	7	1.8	**1**
2007	TB	0	0	—	DNP											
2008	TEN	1	0	0–0	1	2	50.0	7	3.5	0	0	58.3	0	0	0.0	0
2009	DEN	3	1	0–1	5	17	29.4	23	1.4	0	1	15.1	0	0	0.0	0
Career		23	16	7–9	297	511	58.1	3,117	6.1	12	18	69.1	30	52	1.7	1

=== Postseason ===
Year	Team	Games			Passing								Rushing			
Year	Team	GP	GS	Record	Cmp	Att	Pct	Yds	Avg	TD	Int	Rtg	Att	Yds	Avg	TD
2005	TB	1	1	0–1	25	38	65.8	198	6.1	0	2	56.7	3	11	3.7	1
Career		1	1	0–1	25	38	65.8	198	6.1	0	2	56.7	3	11	3.7	1

== Coaching career ==
Simms was hired as a coaching assistant by the New England Patriots on March 26, 2012. He had two main roles. One was in offensive quality control which involved breaking down film for the offense. He also had responsibilities in putting together the scouting report.

== Broadcasting career ==
On July 22, 2013, Chris Simms was included in Fox Sports' commentator lineup for the 2013 college football season. He made his debut as color commentator when West Virginia University played the College of William & Mary on August 31, 2013.

Chris Simms joined Bleacher Report in February 2014 as an NFL analyst.

From 2014 to 2016, Simms was as a color commentator for the NFL on CBS, joining his father as part of the CBS broadcasting team. He left after the 2016 season to join his father's old employer, NBC Sports, where he is a studio analyst for Notre Dame football and a personality on NBC Sports Radio. In March 2019, Simms left Bleacher Report to become a full-time employee of NBC working as an analyst for Football Night In America and Notre Dame football, as well as co-host of ProFootballTalk Live.

In 2021, he began to co-host Peacock's Sunday Night Football Final.

== Personal life ==
Simms married Danielle Marie Puleo in August 2004, whom he first met in high school. Together, they have two children.
