= Peter King (sportswriter) =

American sportswriter (born 1957)

- Born: June 10, 1957 (age 69); Springfield, Massachusetts, U.S.
- Education: Ohio University
- Occupations: Sportswriter; author
- Spouse: Ann
- Children: 2
- Writing career
- Genre: Sports journalism
- Website: profootballtalk.nbcsports.com/category/fmia

Peter Boatswain King (born June 10, 1957) is an American sportswriter. He wrote for Sports Illustrated from 1989 to 2018, including a weekly multiple-page column Monday Morning Quarterback. He is the author of six books, one of which is Inside the Helmet. He has been named National Sportswriter of the Year three times.

Before working at Sports Illustrated, King was a writer for The Cincinnati Enquirer from 1980 to 1985 and Newsday from 1985 to 1989. Since 1992, King has been a member of the Board of Selectors for the Pro Football Hall of Fame in Canton, Ohio. In 2006, he joined Football Night in America, NBC Sports' Sunday night show about the NFL. In May 2018, King announced that he would be ending his 29-year tenure at Sports Illustrated to work for NBC Sports full-time. He continued to publish his long-read column, now titled Football Morning in America and it appears on ProFootballTalk.

In February 2024, King announced his retirement, though he went on to write another book about the NFL, The Game, published in 2026. He spoke of looking forward excitedly to what retirement would bring citing his family's history of not choosing to retire from their respective chosen professions.

== Television ==
King joined the HBO show Inside the NFL in 2002 as a managing editor and reporter. With the return of NFL programming to NBC for the 2006 season, NBC started a studio show called Football Night in America, set between the end of Sunday afternoon games and the primetime Sunday Night Football. He along with Bob Costas, Cris Collinsworth, Sterling Sharpe, and Jerome Bettis served as special "insider" reporters and analysts for the show, highlighting major topics for the day.

== Radio ==
From the 2008 offseason until the fall of 2011, King co-hosted The Opening Drive on Sirius NFL radio with Randy Cross and Bob Papa. King has been a regular contributor to Chris Russo's Sirius XM show, Mad Dog Unleashed, since 2008. King is also a frequent guest on The Dan Patrick Show and was often on ESPN's Golic and Wingo(2017 to 2020).

Once a week during football season, he joins the Musers on Dallas' KTCK-AM/KTCK-FM for a segment. King is an often-used place holder for vital Ticket audio segments as evidenced by the frequent cue given by Ticket Host Junior Miller of “Mark and play for Peter King”.

== Other work ==
In 2005, the governor of New Jersey appointed King to a fact-finding task force in an attempt to end steroid and human growth hormone use in high-school athletics. King is the author of six books on football: Inside the Helmet (1993), Football: A History of the Professional Game (1993), Football (1997), Greatest Quarterbacks (1999), Sports Illustrated Monday Morning Quarterback: A fully caffeinated guide to everything you need to know about the NFL (2009), and The Game (2026).

In 2009, he was awarded the Dick McCann Memorial Award for his work in professional football.

King was a member of the 13-person panel that selected the Top 100 Players in Giants history.

== Personal life ==
King graduated from Enfield High School in Enfield, Connecticut in 1975. He was a three sports star at Enfield playing soccer, basketball, and baseball. He received his degree from Ohio University's E. W. Scripps School of Journalism in Athens. He lives in Brooklyn, New York with his wife Ann, who is a native of the Pittsburgh area. They have two daughters.

In 1997, King was inducted into the Enfield Athletic Hall of Fame.
