= NFL on television in the 1970s =

Majorly-televised sporting events

During the early 1960s, NFL Commissioner Pete Rozelle envisioned the possibility of playing at least one game weekly during prime time that could be viewed by a greater television audience (while the NFL had scheduled Saturday night games on the DuMont Television Network in 1953 and 1954, poor ratings and the dissolution of DuMont led to those games being eliminated by the time CBS took over the rights in 1956). An early bid by the league in 1964 to play on Friday nights was soundly defeated, with critics charging that such telecasts would damage the attendance at high school football games. Undaunted, Rozelle decided to experiment with the concept of playing on Monday night, scheduling the Green Bay Packers and Detroit Lions for a game on September 28, 1964. While the game was not televised, it drew a sellout crowd of 59,203 spectators to Tiger Stadium, the largest crowd ever to watch a professional football game in Detroit up to that point.

Two years later, Rozelle would build on this success as the NFL began a four-year experiment of playing on Monday night, scheduling one game in prime time on CBS during the 1966 and 1967 seasons, and two contests during each of the next two years. NBC followed suit in 1968 and 1969 with games involving American Football League teams.

During subsequent negotiations on a new television contract that would begin in 1970 (coinciding with a merger between the NFL and AFL), Rozelle concentrated on signing a weekly Monday night deal with one of the three major networks. After sensing reluctance from both NBC and CBS in disturbing their regular programming schedules, Rozelle spoke with ABC.

Despite the network's status at the time as the lowest-rated of the three major broadcast networks, ABC was also reluctant to enter the risky venture. It was only after Rozelle used the threat of signing a deal with the independent Hughes Sports Network, an entity bankrolled by reclusive businessman Howard Hughes, did ABC sign a contract for the scheduled games. Speculation was that had Rozelle signed with Hughes, many ABC affiliates would have pre-empted the network's Monday lineup in favor of the games, severely damaging potential ratings.

After the final contract for Monday Night Football was signed, ABC Sports producer Roone Arledge immediately saw possibilities for the new program. Setting out to create an entertainment "spectacle" as much as a simple sports broadcast, Arledge hired Chet Forte, who would serve as director of the program for over 22 years. Arledge also ordered twice the usual number of cameras to cover the game, expanded the regular two-man broadcasting booth to three, and used extensive graphic design within the show as well as instant replay.

== Year-by-year breakdown ==
=== 1970 ===
Super Bowl IV was broadcast in the United States by CBS with play-by-play announcer Jack Buck and color commentator Pat Summerall, with Frank Gifford and Jack Whitaker reporting from the winning and losing locker rooms, respectively. While the game was sold out at Tulane Stadium, the NFL's unconditional blackout rules in place then prohibited the live telecast from being shown in the New Orleans area.

CBS erased the videotape a few days after the game; the same thing it did with Super Bowls I and II, which it broadcast. Videotape was expensive then and networks did not believe old games were worth saving. The only reason video of this game exists is because the CBC in Canada and Radio-Canada in Québec carried the broadcast due to the Vikings' popularity in the country as a whole and the French-speaking province. Additionally, Minnesota's head coach, Bud Grant, was a legendary player and coach in the Canadian Football League. The CBC decided to save it for its archives, transferring the footage to black & white film (kinescope). This, therefore, enabled the CBC to reuse the videotape but also keep a record of the game broadcast, which can be seen on YouTube.

In 1970, after the NFL and AFL completed their merger, NBC signed a contract with the league to broadcast games from the American Football Conference (AFC). Curt Gowdy, who had covered the first five seasons of the American Football League with broadcast partner Paul Christman on ABC, moved over to NBC in the fall of 1965. For the next decade, Gowdy was the lead play-by-play announcer for the network for both AFL football (AFC from 1970 onward) and Major League Baseball games; however, Gowdy also covered a wide range of sports, earning him the nickname of the "broadcaster of everything." Besides Paul Christman, Curt Gowdy's other football broadcast partners were Kyle Rote, Al DeRogatis, Don Meredith, John Brodie and Merlin Olsen.

Looking for a lightning rod to garner attention, Arledge hired controversial New York City sportscaster Howard Cosell as a commentator, along with veteran football play-by-play announcer Keith Jackson. Arledge had tried to lure Curt Gowdy and then Vin Scully to ABC for the MNF play-by-play role, but settled for Jackson after they proved unable to break their respective existing contracts with NBC Sports and the Los Angeles Dodgers. Jack Buck was also considered, but when Arledge assistant Chuck Howard telephoned Buck with the job offer, Buck refused to respond due to anger at his treatment by ABC during an earlier stint with the network. Arledge's original choice for the third member of the trio, Frank Gifford, was unavailable since he was still under contract to CBS Sports. However, Gifford suggested former Dallas Cowboys quarterback Don Meredith, setting the stage for years of fireworks between the often-pompous Cosell and the laid-back Meredith and sometimes, the good-looking Gifford.

On September 20, 1970, The NFL Today signed industry-pioneering women: Marjorie Margolies (who years later won election to the U.S. House from Pennsylvania in 1992 as Marjorie Margolies-Mezsvinsky), who produced and reported features and actress Carole Howey, who also reported for the program.

Monday Night Football first aired on ABC on September 21, 1970, with a game between the New York Jets and the Browns in Cleveland. Advertisers were charged US$65,000 per minute by ABC during the clash, a cost that proved to be a bargain when the contest collected 33% of the viewing audience. The Browns defeated the Jets, 31-21 in a game which featured a 94-yard kickoff return for a touchdown by the Browns' Homer Jones and was punctuated when Billy Andrews intercepted Joe Namath late in the fourth quarter and returned it 25 yards for the clinching touchdown. However, Cleveland viewers saw different programming on WEWS-TV, because of the NFL's blackout rules of the time (this would apply for all games through the end of the 1972 season; beginning in 1973, home games could be televised if tickets were sold out 72 hours before kickoff).

=== 1971 ===
On January 17, 1971, NBC's telecast of Super Bowl V between the Baltimore Colts and Dallas Cowboys was viewed in an estimated 23,980,000 homes, the largest household audience ever for a one-day sports event. The game was called by play-by-play announcer Curt Gowdy and color commentator Kyle Rote. Although the Orange Bowl was sold out for the event, unconditional blackout rules in the NFL prohibited the live telecast from being shown in the Miami area on WSVN. The blackout was challenged in Miami-Dade District Court by attorney Ellis Rubin, and although the judge denied Rubin's request since he felt he did not have the power to overrule the NFL, he agreed with Rubin's argument that the blackout rule was unnecessary for the Super Bowl.

The game was also the first Super Bowl to be carried live in the state of Alaska; thanks to NBC's then-parent company RCA acquiring the Alaska Communications System from the United States Air Force. The complete original broadcast, up until Chuck Howley's second interception, the first play of the fourth quarter exists, however the rest of the fourth quarter is missing from network vaults. Broadcast excerpts of the crucial fourth-quarter plays, recovered from the Canadian feed of NBC's original, do exist and circulate among collectors. (Two different NFL Films game compilations also cover the fourth quarter plays, in part.)

By 1971, the Federal Communications Commission (FCC) introduced the Prime Time Access Rule, which freed local network affiliates in the top 50 markets (in practice, the entire network) to take a half-hour of prime time from the networks on Mondays through Saturdays and one full hour on Sundays. Because nearly all affiliates found production costs for the FCC's intended goal of increased public affairs programming very high and the ratings (and by association, advertising revenues) low, making it mostly unprofitable, the FCC created an exception for network-authored news and public affairs. After a six-month hiatus in late 1971, CBS would find a prime place for 60 Minutes in a portion of that displaced time, 6:00 to 7:00 p.m. (Eastern; 5:00 to 6:00 Central Time) on Sundays, in January 1972. This proved somewhat less than satisfactory, however, because in order to accommodate CBS' telecasts of late afternoon National Football League games, 60 Minutes went on hiatus during the fall from 1972 to 1975 (and the summer of 1972). This took place because football telecasts were protected contractually from interruptions in the wake of the infamous "Heidi Game" incident on NBC in November 1968.

Due largely to CBS' live broadcast of NFL games, as well as other sports events aired by the network that run past their scheduled end time, 60 Minutes sometimes does not start until after 7:00 p.m. Eastern Time, with the program starting right after the conclusion of game coverage (however, on the West Coast, because the actual end of the live games is much earlier in the afternoon in comparison to the Eastern and Central Time Zones, 60 Minutes is always able to start at its normal 7:00 p.m. Pacific start time, leaving affiliates free to broadcast local newscasts, the CBS Evening News, and other local or syndicated programming leading up to 60 Minutes). The program's success has also led CBS Sports to schedule events leading into 60 Minutes and the rest of the network's primetime lineup, causing (again, except on the West Coast) the pre-emptions of the Sunday editions of the CBS Evening News and affiliates' local newscasts.

In 1971, Frank Gifford became available after his contract with CBS Sports concluded; Arledge brought him to ABC to serve as play-by-play announcer, replacing Jackson (who returned to broadcasting college football for the network, which he continued to do for the next 35 seasons). The former New York Giant had been an NFL analyst for CBS during the 1960s but had never called play-by-play prior to joining Monday Night Football. In that capacity for Monday Night Football from 1971 to 1985, Gifford was often criticized for his see-no-evil approach in regard to discussing the NFL, earning him the dubious nickname "Faultless Frank." Regardless, Gifford would have the longest tenure of any broadcaster on the show, lasting until 1998.

Jack Whitaker and Pat Summerall took over hosting duties on The NFL Today from Gifford.

Howard Cosell's abrasive personality gave him enough recognition to host a live variety show on ABC in the fall of 1975. That show is remembered today only as a trivia question, as its title, Saturday Night Live, prevented a new late-night sketch comedy program on NBC from using that title until the ABC show was canceled. That seeming popularity was in contrast to the repeated criticisms in the media, as well as bar room contests in which winners were allowed to throw a brick through a television image of Cosell.

=== 1972 ===
On January 16, 1972, the Dallas Cowboys defeated the Miami Dolphins 24–3 in Super Bowl VI in New Orleans. The CBS telecast had an estimated household viewership of 27,450,000 homes, the highest-rated single-day telecast ever at the time. Although Tulane Stadium was sold out for the game, unconditional blackout rules in the NFL prohibited the live telecast from being shown in the New Orleans market. This would be the last Super Bowl to be blacked out in the television market in which the game was played. The following year, the NFL allowed Super Bowl VII to be televised live in the host city (Los Angeles) when all tickets were sold. In 1973, the NFL changed its blackout policy to allow games to be broadcast in the home team's market if tickets are sold out 72 hours in advance (all Super Bowls since the second have sold out, as it is the main event on the NFL schedule, and there is high demand for Super Bowl tickets).

=== 1973 ===
On January 14, 1973, NBC's telecast of Super Bowl VII between the Miami Dolphins and Washington Redskins was watched by approximately 75 million viewers. The game, called by Curt Gowdy and Al DeRogatis, was the first Super Bowl to be televised live in the city where it was being played. Despite the league's unconditional blackout rules that normally would have prohibited the live telecast from being shown locally, the NFL allowed the game to be telecast in the Los Angeles area on KNBC on an experimental basis when all tickets for the game were sold. The league then changed its blackout rules the following season to allow games sold out at least 72 hours in advance to be televised in the host market. No subsequent Super Bowl has ever been blacked out in the city it has been played in, since all of them have been sold out.

In 1973, The NFL Today began originating from CBS' New York City studios; the program also began to include reports from stadiums around the country; however, it continued to be pre-recorded before each week's game day.

After beginning with critical acclaim, Don Meredith began to take his weekly assignments less seriously, while also beginning an acting career. By 1973, his behavior on the broadcasts seemed highly suspect, given incidents during a trio of contests. On October 29, Meredith was drinking during the Buffalo Bills–Kansas City Chiefs game, which was preceded one week earlier by his pre-game analysis of the Denver Broncos–Oakland Raiders game: "We're in the Mile High City and I sure am" – a not-so-subtle reference to his use of marijuana at the time. Finally, during the Pittsburgh Steelers–Washington Redskins game on November 5, he referred to U.S. President Richard Nixon as "Tricky Dick".

On November 4, 1973, local San Francisco CBS affiliate KPIX (now an owned-and-operated station of the network) experimented with a "simulcast" in which the station kept switching back and forth between the network's broadcasts of a San Francisco 49ers game (against the Detroit Lions) and an Oakland Raiders game (against the New York Giants) that were being played at the same time, with frequent cuts to studio host Barry Tompkins. The station received many complaints from viewers, however, and the experiment was not repeated. This resulted in the NFL instituting new rules for markets that had two teams, which basically state that teams televised in two markets must play their games at different times in the day or week, or one of the teams must be on the road, or the teams' games must be on different networks. (For example, an NFL schedule for a given week in markets with two team franchises might look like this: Oakland at Kansas City, 1:00 p.m.; New York Giants at Philadelphia, 1:00 p.m.; San Diego at San Francisco, 4:15 p.m.; and New England at New York Jets, 8:00 p.m.)

On December 16, 1973, NBC cameras were there to cover O. J. Simpson as he rushed for 2,000 yards in one season. On that particular day, Simpson's Buffalo Bills would go on to beat the New York Jets at Shea Stadium.

=== 1974 ===
Super Bowl VIII was televised in the United States by CBS with play-by-play announcer Ray Scott and color commentators Pat Summerall and Bart Starr. This was Scott's final telecast for CBS. Midway through the following season Summerall would take Scott's place as the network's lead play-by-play announcer, holding that position through 1993, when CBS lost rights to the NFC television package to Fox.

In 1974, CBS abandoned the pre-recorded NFL Today broadcast and its short-form wrap-up show, Pro Football Report, for a live, wraparound style program titled The NFL on CBS. It started a half-hour prior to kickoff of either the singleheader or doubleheader telecast (12:30, 1:30 or 3:30 p.m. Eastern Time). On September 15, 1974, the revamped program debuted with a new three-segment format: the first segment featured highlights of the day's games and commentary, special features shot during the week were broadcast during the second segment, and the third segment covered the day's sports news, including scores and highlights at halftime. The program's hosts were Jack Whitaker (who was brought into the studio after quite a few years serving as a play-by-play announcer for the network's NFL broadcasts) and Lee Leonard.

The program broke ground in a number of ways: it was the first live pre-game show, the first to show halftime highlights of other games televised by CBS, and the first to wrap-up as a post-game show. CBS also began referring to its stadium studios or its pre-game set, previously known as "CBS Control," as the "CBS Sports Center". The program also no longer featured a third member of the on-air crew stationed at CBS Control to provide scores, halftime information and – time permitting – post-game interviews, a position often held by Dick Stockton during his early days at the network.

Don Meredith would be absent from Monday Night Football for a broadcasting and acting career on rival NBC from 1974 to 1976. Fred Williamson, a former Kansas City Chiefs defensive back nicknamed "The Hammer" for his often-brutal hits, was selected by ABC to replace Meredith in 1974, but following a few pre-season broadcasts, proved so inarticulate that he was relieved of his duties prior to the start of the regular season, becoming the first MNF personality not to last an entire season (much less no part of the regular season at all). Williamson was replaced by fellow Gary, Indiana native Alex Karras, formerly of the Detroit Lions. The highlight of Williamson's MNF career was probably at the introductory press conference where he quipped that he was hired to "bring some color to the booth."

Karras made his debut on September 16, 1974 and immediately made an impact when he jokingly referred to Oakland Raiders' defensive lineman Otis Sistrunk as having attended "The University of Mars." That would essentially be the high point of Karras' three-year tenure, with a developing movie career often distracting him from showing any improvement (in reality, Sistrunk did not attend any college but enlisted in the United States Marine Corps after high school and played semi-professional football before getting a tryout with the Raiders; the Raiders team guide listed his college alma mater as "U.S. Mars").

During the October 13, 1974, New Orleans Saints–Denver Broncos game, the broadcasting duo of play-by-play announcer Don Criqui and color commentator Irv Cross was supplemented by the contributions of the first woman ever on an NFL telecast, Jane Chastain, a sports reporter for WTVJ, Miami's CBS affiliate. While providing limited commentary, Chastain was used on an irregular basis over the rest of the season.

=== 1975 ===
Super Bowl IX was broadcast in the United States by NBC with play-by-play announcer Curt Gowdy and color commentators Al DeRogatis and Don Meredith. Charlie Jones served as the event's field reporter and covered the trophy presentation; while hosting the coverage was NBC News reporter Jack Perkins and Jeannie Morris (Morris, then the wife of former Chicago Bears wide receiver and WMAQ-TV sports anchor Johnny Morris) became the first woman to participate in Super Bowl coverage). Prior to the 1975 NFL season, NBC did not have a regular pregame show.

In 1975, CBS debuted The NFL Today, a pre-game show originally hosted by journalist Brent Musburger and former NFL player Irv Cross, with former Miss America Phyllis George serving as one of the reporters. Jimmy Snyder, nicknamed "The Greek", joined the program in 1976. Snyder was dismissed by CBS Sports at the end of the 1987 season, one day after making comments about racial differences among NFL players on Martin Luther King, Jr. Day in January 1988. Phyllis George was replaced by Jayne Kennedy (who was crowned Miss Ohio USA in 1970) for the 1978 season, only for Kennedy to depart at the end of the following season. George would return in 1980 and stay on through the 1983 season; she was replaced by Charlsie Cantey. In 1979, the first year that the Sports Emmy Awards were awarded to sportscasts, The NFL Today was among the recipients.

Meanwhile, NBC's first official NFL pre-game show, GrandStand, a program that doubled as a competing sports anthology series to ABC's Wide World of Sports during the off-season (GrandStand also served as the pre-game show for NBC's Major League Baseball Game of the Week during the 1976 season) premiered with hosts Jack Buck and Bryant Gumbel (who joined Buck sometime later in the season). Prior to 1975, NBC would air the political talk show Meet the Press in the NFL pre-game show's timeslot (12:30 p.m. Eastern Time).

Also by 1975, CBS used several themes (technically, CBS had different opening songs and graphics per crew) to open their broadcasts, ranging from David Shire's "Manhattan Skyline" from the Saturday Night Fever soundtrack to "Fly, Robin, Fly" by the Silver Convention. Around this time, Electric Light Orchestra's "Fire on High" was also used as a lead-in to the broadcast.

One of the trademarks of Monday Night Football is a music cue used during the opening teasers of each program, a Johnny Pearson-composition titled "Heavy Action", originally a KPM production library cue (and also used as the theme music for the BBC programme Superstars), which MNF began using in 1975.

In 1975, because of NBC's coverage of Game 2 of the World Series between the Cincinnati Reds and Boston Red Sox, NBC's 1:00 p.m. NFL telecasts were cancelled. All games except for the New England Patriots–Cincinnati Bengals match were picked up by local stations in the markets of the visiting team. Meanwhile, at 4:00 p.m. Eastern Time, NBC aired a game between the Oakland Raiders and Kansas City Chiefs nationally. As the 1975 World Series progressed, NBC would advertise its upcoming weekend schedule during the breaks:

If we have a Game 7, we'll have The Baseball World of Joe Garagiola at 12:30 and Game 7 from Fenway. Otherwise, we'll have GrandStand at 12:30, and Buffalo/Miami for most of you at 1:00. Either way, you win at NBC.

As it turned out, no baseball was played that Sunday. Three days of rain in Boston forced Game 6 to be postponed until the following Tuesday, October 21, followed by Game 7 the next night.

=== 1976 ===
CBS' 1976 telecast of Super Bowl X between the Pittsburgh Steelers and Dallas Cowboys was viewed by an estimated 80 million people, the largest television audience in history at the time. CBS' telecast featured play-by-play announcer Pat Summerall (calling his first Super Bowl in that role) and color commentator Tom Brookshier. Towards the end of the game, Hank Stram took over for Brookshier, who had left the booth to head down to the locker room area to conduct the postgame interviews with the winning team.

Hosting television coverage was The NFL Today crew of Brent Musburger; Irv Cross and Phyllis George. During this game, CBS began using Jack Trombey's "Horizontal Hold" as the theme music. That would be used the following season for the NFL Today pregame show between 1976 and 1980 in its original form, with a remake for 1981 followed by updates for 1984 and 1989 before its retirement.

By this time, The NFL Today began the complex process of producing three separate live pre-game, halftime and postgame programs for 1:00 p.m., 2:00 p.m. (through 1981) and 4:00 p.m. (Eastern Time) games. Also for the first time, signature musical pieces are produced for NFL coverage. The show's signature theme was "Horizontal Hold," a piece by Jan Stoeckart (recorded under his pseudonym of Jack Trombey). The NFL Today was among the recipients of the Sports Emmy Awards in its inaugural event in 1979.

In 1976, Jack Buck left GrandStand in order to return to the booth as a play-by-play announcer, remaining with NBC. He was replaced as co-host by Lee Leonard.

Leonard (who would later become a co-host of ESPN's SportsCenter) left the program in 1977, and was replaced by Mike Adamle and Regina Haskins as Gumbel's co-hosts. For the post-game show, GrandStand kept the Sperry NFL Report, although later incarnations of the post-game would be retitled the Budweiser NFL Report.

On October 12, 1976, Commissioner Pete Rozelle negotiated contracts with the three television networks to televise all NFL regular-season and postseason games, as well as selected preseason games, for four years beginning with the 1978 season. ABC was awarded yearly rights to 16 Monday night games, four prime time games, the AFC-NFC Pro Bowl, and the Hall of Fame Games. CBS received the rights to all NFC regular season and postseason games (except those in the ABC package) and to Super Bowls XIV and XVI. NBC received the rights to all AFC regular season and postseason games (except those in the ABC package) and to Super Bowls XIII and XV. Industry sources considered it the largest single television package ever negotiated.

=== 1977 ===
On January 9, 1977, 81.9 million people (the largest audience ever for a sports event at that point) watched NBC's telecast of Super Bowl XI between the Oakland Raiders and Minnesota Vikings. Only three other television events prior to that time, all of which aired on all three commercial networks of the era (the funeral of President John F. Kennedy, the 1969 moonwalk of Neil Armstrong and Buzz Aldrin; and the 1974 resignation speech of President Richard M. Nixon), attracted more viewers than Super Bowl IX. The game was also the last broadcast that color commentator Don Meredith, who called the game with Gowdy, did for NBC, as he returned to ABC to rejoin the Monday Night Football crew for the 1977 season, where he had been a commentator from 1970–73. Bryant Gumbel and Lee Leonard with analyst John Brodie anchored NBC's pregame, halftime and postgame coverage.

At the height of the disco fad, from 1977 to 1979, CBS used Meco's "Star Wars Theme/Cantina Band," a disco arrangement of John Williams's theme from Star Wars, as a musical theme.

In 1977, NBC dropped the GrandStand moniker in favor of NFL, which the title being paired with a year number that corresponded to the then-current NFL season (such as NFL '77 and NFL '78). Beginning with NFL '80, NBC would pioneer the use of the in-game highlight packages ("Let's go to New York for an NFL '80 update") NBC would use this particular method of titling their pregame show until the 1987 season.

Meredith returned to the ABC booth in 1977, but seemed to lack the enthusiasm that had marked his first stint from 1970 to 1973. While the NFL moved to a 16-week schedule in 1978, Meredith was contractually obligated to work only 14 games, leaving Cosell and Gifford to work games as a duo or with newly retired Fran Tarkenton beginning in 1979.

From 1977 to 1986, ABC also aired occasional NFL games on Thursday, Saturday and Sunday nights. Each of these telecasts would be billed by the network as a "Special Thursday/Saturday/Sunday Night Edition of Monday Night Football".

On October 12, 1977, Commissioner Pete Rozelle negotiated contracts with the three television networks to televise all NFL regular season and postseason games, as well as select preseason games, for four years beginning with the 1978 season. ABC was awarded yearly rights to 16 Monday night games, four prime time games, the AFC-NFC Pro Bowl, and the Hall of Fame Games. CBS received the rights to all National Football Conference (NFC) regular season and postseason games (except those in the ABC package) and to Super Bowls XIV and XVI. NBC received the rights to all AFC regular-season and postseason games (except those in the ABC package) and to Super Bowls XIII and XV. Industry sources considered it the largest single television package ever negotiated.

=== 1978 ===
On January 15, 1978, the Dallas Cowboys defeated the Denver Broncos in Super Bowl XII in front of the largest audience ever to watch a sporting event. CBS scored a 47.2/67 national household rating/share, the highest-rated Super Bowl to date.

This game was the first Super Bowl to be played in prime time, was broadcast in the United States by CBS with play-by-play announcer Pat Summerall and color commentator Tom Brookshier. The game kicked off at 5:17 p.m. Central Standard Time. Hosting the coverage was The NFL Today hosts Brent Musburger; Irv Cross; Phyllis George (in the last game of her first stint on the NFL Today before leaving to host the short-lived People the following season). Also contributing were Hank Stram (who had recently been fired by the New Orleans Saints); Jimmy "The Greek" Snyder; Sonny Jurgensen (working on CBS Radio coverage); Gary Bender; Paul Hornung; Nick Buoniconti and Jack Whitaker. Buoniconti and Hornung served as sideline reporters; with Hornung doing postgame interviews in the Broncos' locker room; while Bender covered the trophy presentation in the Cowboy locker room.

An interesting aspect was the use of what was called an Electronic Palette graphics system (created by CBS and Ampex) for a painting-like aspect to several visual graphics; such as the game intro, starting lineups and bumpers going into or coming out of a commercial break. CBS would also unveil what was known as the "Action Track"; showing the trail of a football that had been kicked during replays. Also, when the planned lead-in (the Phoenix Open golf tournament) was halted due to poor weather, CBS Sports president Robert Wussler (in New York) and producer Barry Frank (at the Superdome) ended up filling the time period with an impromptu look at how the game would be produced.

As in their previous Super Bowl; CBS used the Frank Sinatra song "Winners" to play over the closing montage.

Prior to 1978, Monday night games were not scheduled in the final week (Week 14) of the regular season. From 1974 to 1977, a Saturday night game was scheduled for Week 14 and televised live by ABC in lieu of a game on Monday night.

One of the more somber contests in the run of the Monday Night Football series came on November 27, 1978 when the San Francisco 49ers hosted the Pittsburgh Steelers. Earlier in the day, San Francisco mayor George Moscone and City Supervisor Harvey Milk had been murdered at City Hall. Despite the complaints that followed, the NFL chose to play the game, a decision that mirrored the league's decision to play its scheduled games during the weekend following the assassination of President John F. Kennedy 15 years earlier.

After the 1975 World Series, Curt Gowdy was removed from NBC's baseball telecasts, when sponsor Chrysler insisted on having Joe Garagiola (who served as a spokesman in many of the automotive manufacturer's commercials) be the lead play-by-play voice. Gowdy continued as NBC's lead NFL announcer through the 1978 season, with his final broadcast being the memorable Super Bowl XIII between the Pittsburgh Steelers and Dallas Cowboys. With NBC now anxious to promote Dick Enberg (who hosted NBC's pre-game and post-game coverage of Super Bowl XIII) to the lead NFL position, Gowdy moved over to CBS to call more football, as well as baseball on radio.

=== 1979 ===
NBC's January 21, 1979 telecast of Super Bowl XIII between the Pittsburgh Steelers and Dallas Cowboys was viewed in 35,090,000 households, by an estimated 96.6 million fans. The game – called by Curt Gowdy on play-by-play, with Merlin Olsen and John Brodie on color commentary and Dick Enberg served as the pregame host for the broadcast with Bryant Gumbel and Mike Adamle as sideline reporters – was Gowdy's seventh and final Super Bowl telecast, and his last major event for NBC before moving to CBS later in 1979. Enberg had essentially succeeded Gowdy as NBC's lead NFL play-by-play announcer in the 1978 regular season, and network producers did not decide until nearly the last minute which of them would conduct play-by-play for that year's Super Bowl. NBC preceded the game with the first network broadcast of Black Sunday, a 1977 film that depicts a terrorist attack on a fictitious Super Bowl game in the Orange Bowl between Pittsburgh and Dallas (and which utilized footage shot during Super Bowl X). The pregame festivities featured the Dallas Cowboys Cheerleaders and several military bands. The Colgate Thirteen performed the national anthem. The coin toss ceremony featured Pro Football Hall of Famer and longtime Chicago Bears owner/head coach George Halas.

The opening Monday night contest of the 1979 season saw a poignant moment as former New England Patriots wide receiver Darryl Stingley was introduced to a sellout crowd at the Patriots' Schaefer Stadium. Stingley had been paralyzed in a preseason game the year before and was making his first visit to the stadium since the accident.

== See also ==
- NFL on television
- History of the NFL on television
- List of NFL Championship Game broadcasters
- List of Super Bowl broadcasters
- History of Monday Night Football
