= NFL on CBS =

Broadcasts of NFL games produced by CBS Sports

- Logo used since 2021
- Genre: American football game telecasts
- Presented by: The NFL Today crew; NFL on CBS game commentators
- Opening theme: See NFL on CBS music
- Ending theme: Same as opening
- Country of origin: United States
- Original language: English
- No. of seasons: 68 (through 2026 season)
- No. of episodes: 6,133

Production
- Production locations: Various NFL stadiums (game telecasts and playoff pre-game, halftime and post-game shows); CBS Broadcast Center; New York City (pre-game, halftime and post-game shows)
- Camera setup: Multi-camera
- Running time: 210 minutes or until game ends (inc. adverts)
- Production companies: National Football League; CBS Sports

Original release
- Network: CBS
- Release: September 30, 1956 – January 23, 1994
- Network: CBS; Paramount+ Nickelodeon (select games)
- Release: September 6, 1998 – present

Related
- The NFL Today; NFL on Yahoo! NFL on Nickelodeon; NFL on 5 NFL on TNT

The NFL on CBS is an American television sports presentation show broadcast by CBS. It aired from September 30, 1956, to January 23, 1994. The show returned on September 6, 1998. It consists of branding used for the presentation of National Football League (NFL) games.

From 2014 to 2017, CBS also broadcast Thursday Night Football games during the first half of the NFL season, through a production partnership with NFL Network.

== History ==
CBS' coverage began on September 30, 1956 (the first regular season broadcast was a game between the visiting Washington Redskins against the Pittsburgh Steelers), before the 1970 AFL–NFL merger. Prior to 1968, CBS had an assigned crew for each NFL team. As a result, CBS became the first network to broadcast some NFL regular season games to selected television markets across the country. From 1970 until the end of the 1993 season, when Fox won the broadcast television contract to that particular conference, CBS aired NFL games from the National Football Conference. Since 1975, game coverage has been preceded by pre-game show The NFL Today, which features game previews, extensive analysis and interviews.

=== 1950s ===
In August 1956, the DuMont Television Network, the NFL's primary television partner, ended network operations after years of decline. DuMont had already sold the rights to the NFL Championship to NBC in 1955, and when DuMont ended its regular season coverage, CBS acquired the rights.

CBS's first attempts to broadcast the NFL on television were notable for there being no broadcasting contract with the league as a whole. Instead, CBS had to strike deals with individual teams to broadcast games into the teams' own markets, many of which CBS had purchased from the moribund DuMont Television Network. Every club but Cleveland joined forces with CBS. Meanwhile, in order to show regional games to regional audiences, CBS set out to divide its network into nine regional networks: New York, Philadelphia, Baltimore, Pittsburgh, Washington, Green Bay, Chicago and on the Pacific Coast (Los Angeles and San Francisco).

Often the games would be broadcast with "split audio" – that is, a game between two franchises would have the same picture in both teams' "networks" (the visiting team's home city and affiliates of the home team's "network" beyond a 75-mile radius of the home team's television market). Each team's "network" had different announcers (usually those working in their home markets).

The 1957 Pro Bowl was offered to NBC, then CBS. Both declined to carry the game. ABC was then offered to televise and accepted, but could not gain enough clearance of affiliates in time to make it a profitable venture. Thus they also dropped out and the game was not televised.

By 1959, CBS had at least 11 teams under contract. The Cleveland Browns were still the lone exception.

=== 1960s ===
1960 saw the addition of a new team to the NFL in the form of the Dallas Cowboys. At this point, out of the 13 NFL teams, 10 were aligned with CBS. Two joined forces with NBC (the Colts and the Steelers) and one (the Browns) rejoined its partner, the syndicated Sports Network. Also, the Chicago Cardinals moved to St Louis. So both the expansion Cowboys and relocated Cardinals would cut severely into the monstrous Chicago CBS Network. A silver lining of this however was that WBBM viewers would at least, be able to see at least away games of their Bears on television, after being virtually shut out from pro football telecasts for years.

1961 would serve as the final year that each NFL team would be on their own for television coverage. CBS had 11 teams under contract, including the expansion Minnesota Vikings. NBC continued to televise 13 Sundays involving either the Colts and Steelers (the odd week was when NBC had the World Series) and the Browns again had their deal with Carling Beer and the Sports Network (SNI, forerunner to the Hughes Sports Network). On September 17, 1961, CBS Sports broadcast the first remote 15-minute pre-game show, the first of its kind on network sports television; Pro Football Kickoff originated from NFL stadiums around the country with a comprehensive look at all the day's games.

Then-CBS affiliate WISN-TV (channel 12, now an ABC affiliate) in Milwaukee opted not to carry that 1961's annual telecast of The Wizard of Oz, running a Green Bay Packers football game instead. In contrast to the infamous Heidi telecast in 1968, the popularity of The Wizard of Oz as an annual television event at that time was such that the station ran the movie locally at a later date.

==== The end of each team having its own TV coverage ====
In 1962, the NFL followed the American Football League's (AFL) suit with its own revenue sharing plan after CBS agreed to telecast all regular season games for an annual fee of US$4.65 million. CBS also acquired the rights to the championship games for 1964 and 1965 for $1.8 million per game, on April 17, 1964.

CBS executive vice president James T. Aubrey, Jr., who on May 9, 1963, warned the network's affiliates the high cost of rights for professional sports could price them off television, nevertheless in January 1964 agreed to pay $28.2 million to air National Football League games for two years, spanning 17 games each season. In an interview with The New York Times, Aubrey said regarding the package, "We know how much these games mean to the viewing audience, our affiliated stations, and the nation's advertisers". Along with obtaining the aforementioned rights to the NFL Championship Game, in April 1964, he agreed to extend the deal for another year for a total of $31.8 million. With this deal, CBS now had full rights to air all of the NFL's games.

==== The fallout from the JFK assassination ====
On November 24, 1963, just two days after the assassination of President John F. Kennedy, the NFL played its normal schedule of games. Commissioner Pete Rozelle said about playing the games: "It has been traditional in sports for athletes to perform in times of great personal tragedy. Football was Mr. Kennedy's game. He thrived on competition." No NFL games were telecast (CBS Chairman Bill Paley ordered no telecasts of any NFL games played during the period of mourning), since on the afternoon of November 22, just after Kennedy had been pronounced dead, CBS President Frank Stanton ordered that all regular programming be pre-empted until after Kennedy was buried at his funeral procession. Normal programming, including the NFL, was replaced by non-stop news coverage, broadcast without commercials.

==== Half and half format ====
In 1964, CBS experimented with a "half-and-half" format for their announcers. The first half of each telecast would be called by the home teams' commentators while the second half would be done by the visitors' commentators (this practice would later be revived decades later by the NFL Network when replaying preseason games that were broadcast by local stations as opposed to a national network). Also in 1964, CBS ditched the concept of using pooled video and split audio feeds. In 1962 and 1963, CBS would provide separate audio for a telecast (for instance, if the Green Bay Packers hosted the Chicago Bears, the telecast would have the same video, Chicago area viewers watching on WBBM-TV would hear Red Grange and George Connor call the action; meanwhile, viewers in Milwaukee and other parts of Wisconsin — Green Bay itself was blacked out — would hear Ray Scott and Tony Canadeo describe the game). Ray Scott was not a fan of the separate audio concept and temporarily left CBS for a job calling a regional slate of college football games for NBC. Ultimately, CBS dumped the four-man crew and resumed the 1962–63 method for the great majority of games in 1965, 1966 and 1967.

CBS' afternoon exhibition telecast of Dallas vs. San Francisco on August 21, 1965, was interrupted by coverage of the Gemini V blastoff, which resulted in a healthy amount of angry phone calls from fans. The game (called by John Roach, Frank Glieber, and Gordy Soltau) was subsequently broadcast on tape-delay basis the following afternoon in a number of cities due to the late start. The August 26 exhibition game between Baltimore-Cleveland game (called by Glieber and Pat Summerall) however was not tape-delayed. it was the nightcap of Art Modell's exhibition doubleheader that ran from 1962-71.

On November 25, 1965 (Thanksgiving Day), CBS featured the first color broadcast of a regular-season NFL game, the traditional Thanksgiving Day game at Detroit. It was only the second time that the network's first color mobile unit had been used (it had been used a month earlier to cover the attempted launch of an Atlas-Agena, which was to have been the rendezvous target for the Gemini 6 space mission). Only a handful of games during the rest of the season were shown in color, along with the NFL Western Conference Playoff, the NFL Championship Game, the Playoff Bowl and the Pro Bowl. In 1966, most of the network's NFL games were broadcast in color, and by 1968, all of the network's NFL telecasts were in color.

On December 29, 1965, CBS acquired the rights to the NFL regular season games in 1966 and 1967, with an option to extend the contract through 1968, for $18.8 million per year (in sharp contrast to the $14.1 million per year it paid for the rights in 1964). On February 14, 1966, the rights to the 1966 and 1967 NFL Championship Games (the Ice Bowl) were sold to CBS for $2 million per game. 1967 also marked the last year that CBS had separate commentator crews for each team for about 90% to 95% of their NFL games.

==== The beginning of the Super Bowl era ====
For the 1966 season, CBS featured a number of regular season games in color, stepping up from the sole regular season color telecast in 1965, including all postseason games. The Week 1 game between Baltimore and Green Bay was a national Saturday night telecast. Ray Scott and Pat Summerall called the first half, while Chuck Thompson and Summerall worked the second half. This was a black and white telecast. With Summerall working the Green Bay-Baltimore game and with the Cowboys idle, Eddie LeBaron filled in for Summerall on the Cleveland-Washington game (alongside Jim Gibbons) for Redskins viewers. Frank Glieber and Warren Lahr called the game for Browns viewers. With Lowell Perry as analyst for the Pittsburgh network in 1966 alongside Joe Tucker, October 2 (where the Steelers played against the Redskins) was most likely the first time ever an African-American was in the television booth as on-air talent for a pro football telecast. In Week 5, Pat Summerall was called upon to work Green Bay-San Francisco doubleheader game with Ray Scott. While Scott and feature analyst Summerall worked the telecast for national viewing audience, CBS used local audio for San Francisco network with Bob Fouts and Gordy Soltau. Meanwhile, for the Atlanta-Washington game, Jim Gibbons worked with Johnny Sauer for first half while Ed Thilenius worked with Sauer for second half.

In Week 11 of the 1966 season, the Philadelphia-San Francisco game was a regional telecast with a single audio feed. San Francisco play-by-play announcer Bob Fouts worked with Philadelphia analyst Tom Brookshier, while Chick Hearn was called in for CBS Control duty. For that year's Thanksgiving Day game, CBS aired a "day/twilight" doubleheader that were both in color. For the San Francisco-Detroit game, Van Patrick and Frank Gifford called the first half while Bob Fouts and Gifford worked the second half. For the Cleveland-Dallas game, Jack Buck and Pat Summerall were on the call for the first half, while Frank Glieber and Summerall announced the second half. Week 12's Green Bay-Minnesota game was the Sunday doubleheader telecast. Hal Scott called the first half, while Ray Scott called the second half. Tony Canadeo was the analyst for the full game and Jim Morse had CBS Control duties. For Week 12, St. Louis-Dallas was the main doubleheader game with Jack Buck and Eddie LeBaron working the first half and Jack Drees and LeBaron calling the second half.

The first AFL-NFL World Championship Game was played on January 15, 1967. Because CBS held the rights to nationally televise NFL games and NBC had the rights to broadcast AFL games, it was decided by the newly merged league to have both of them cover that first game. Ray Scott, Jack Whitaker, Frank Gifford and Pat Summerall called the game for CBS. 39.9 million viewers would watch Bart Starr's performance in the game that earned him the MVP trophy. NBC did have some problems. The network did not return from a commercial break during halftime in time for the start of the second half; therefore, the first kickoff was stopped by the game's officials and was redone once NBC was back on the air. NBC was also forced to broadcast the game over CBS' feed and cameras (CBS received prerogative to use its feed and camera angles since the Los Angeles Memorial Coliseum was home to the NFL's Rams). In other words, NBC's crew had little to no control over how the game was shot. The next three AFL-NFL World Championship Games, later renamed the Super Bowl, were then divided by the two networks: CBS televised Super Bowls II and IV while NBC covered Super Bowl III.

==== The Ice Bowl ====
The 1967 NFL Championship Game between the Green Bay Packers and Dallas Cowboys featured play-by-play being done by Ray Scott for the first half and Jack Buck for the second half, while Frank Gifford handled the color commentary for the entire game. Pat Summerall and Tom Brookshier served as sideline reporters. Gifford and Summerall were intimately aware of the personality differences that existed between Dallas head coach Tom Landry and Green Bay head coach Vince Lombardi because they had both played on the New York Giants during Landry's and Lombardi's tenure at the Giants. Over 30 million people would tune in to watch the game.

On third-and-goal at the Dallas two-foot line with 16 seconds remaining, Green Bay quarterback Bart Starr went to the sidelines to confer with Lombardi. Starr had asked right guard Jerry Kramer whether he could get enough traction on the icy turf for a wedge play, and Kramer responded with an unequivocal yes. Summerall told the rest of CBS crew to get ready for a roll-out pass, because without any timeouts remaining a failed run play would end the game. Landry would say he expected a rollout pass attempt because an incompletion would stop the clock and allow the Packers one more play on fourth down, either for a touchdown (to win) or a field goal attempt (to tie and send the game into overtime). But Green Bay's pass protection on the slick field had been seriously tested during the game; the Cowboys had sacked Starr eight times.

Frank Gifford recounted in his 1993 autobiography The Whole Ten Yards that he requested and received permission from CBS producers to go into the losing locker room for on-air post-game interviews—a practice unheard of in that era. Gifford, as a New York Giants player and a broadcaster, already enjoyed a friendship with Don Meredith, and he approached the quarterback for his thoughts on the game. The exhausted Meredith, in an emotion-choked voice, expressed pride in his teammates' play, and said, in a figurative sense, that he felt the Cowboys did not really lose the game because the effort expended was its own reward. Gifford wrote that the interview attracted considerable attention, and that Meredith's forthcoming and introspective responses played a part in his selection for ABC's Monday Night Football telecasts three years later.

No copy of the complete telecast is known to exist. Some excerpts (such as the announcers' pre-game comments on the field) were saved and are occasionally re-aired in retrospective features. The Cowboys' radio broadcast on KLIF, with Bill Mercer announcing, and the Packers' radio broadcast on WTMJ, with Ted Moore announcing, still exist.

==== The beginning of the semi-merit system ====
The August 11, 1968, exhibition game between Detroit and Philadelphia was originally scheduled for Mexico City, but was cancelled due to growing student demonstrations on August 8. The following day, the game was rescheduled to Philadelphia.

When CBS decided to abandon its practice of using dedicated announcing crews for particular teams in 1968, the network instituted a semi-merit system in its place, with certain crews (such as Ray Scott and Paul Christman or Jack Buck and Pat Summerall) being assigned to each week's most prominent games regardless of the participating teams.

On December 22, 1968, CBS interrupted coverage of a Western Conference championship game between the Minnesota Vikings and Baltimore Colts in order to show a broadcast from inside the Apollo 8 spacecraft, headed towards the Moon (the first crewed space mission to orbit the Moon, and a major step towards the lunar landing the following July). The interruption began approximately three minutes before halftime of the game, and lasted 17 minutes. CBS showed highlights of the missed action (in which neither team scored) when the network returned to football coverage; nonetheless, the network received approximately 3,000 complaints after the game.

In the late 1960s and early 1970s, CBS used a marching band-like instrumental arrangement of the song "Confidence" (from Leon Carr's score for the 1964 off-Broadway musical The Secret Life of Walter Mitty) as the theme for their NFL broadcasts.

With 1969 being the final season before the AFL–NFL merger, this was also the final season where both leagues would have Thanksgiving doubleheaders. Starting in 1970, only two games would be played on Thanksgiving, with the Lions and Cowboys hosting those games, and an AFC team rotating as the visiting team between Detroit and Dallas every year.

==== Monday night games on CBS ====
During the early 1960s, NFL Commissioner Pete Rozelle envisioned the possibility of playing at least one game weekly during prime time for a greater television audience. An early bid by ABC in 1964 to have the league play a weekly game on Friday nights was abandoned, with critics charging that such telecasts would damage the attendance at high school games. Undaunted, Rozelle decided to experiment with the concept of playing on Monday night, scheduling the Green Bay Packers and Detroit Lions for a game on September 28, 1964. While the game was not televised, it drew a sellout crowd of 59,203 spectators to Tiger Stadium, the largest crowd to watch a professional football game in Detroit up to that point.

Two years later, Rozelle would build on this success as the NFL began a four-year experiment of playing on Monday night, scheduling a total of five Monday night games on CBS from 1966 to 1969 (including two in 1968). The first prime-time telecast on CBS was on Saturday night, September 10, 1966, with the Baltimore Colts opening the season against the Green Bay Packers at Milwaukee. The first Monday night national telecast was on October 31, 1966, with the St. Louis Cardinals winning at home over the Chicago Bears, 24–17. NBC followed suit in 1968 and 1969 with games involving AFL teams.

The Chicago-St. Louis game on October 31, 1966, was a national Monday night telecast except in St. Louis. Jack Drees and Frank Gifford called the first half and Lindsey Nelson and Gifford did the second half. This was almost certainly the first NFL prime time game ever televised in color. The Green Bay-St. Louis game from a year later on October 30 was likewise, also a prime time "coast to coast" telecast. Jack Drees again did play-by-play for the first half, while this time, Ray Scott did play-by-play for the second half, and Frank Gifford was the analyst for the full game.

During subsequent negotiations on a television contract that would begin in 1970, Rozelle concentrated on signing a weekly Monday night deal with one of the three major networks. After sensing reluctance from both NBC and CBS in disturbing their regular programming schedules, Rozelle spoke with ABC.

Despite the network's status as the lowest-rated network, ABC was also reluctant to enter the risky venture. Only after the independent Hughes Sports Network, an entity bankrolled by reclusive businessman Howard Hughes showed interest, did ABC sign a contract for the scheduled games. Speculation was that had Rozelle signed with Hughes, many ABC affiliates would have pre-empted the network's Monday lineup in favor of the games, severely damaging potential ratings. There was even talk that one or two ABC owned-and-operated stations would have ditched the network feed to carry the games.

=== 1970s ===
When the AFL and the NFL officially merged in 1970, the combined league divided its teams into the American Football Conference (AFC) and the National Football Conference (NFC). It was then decided (officially announced on January 26, 1970) that CBS would televise all NFC teams (including playoff games) while NBC would carry games from all AFC teams. For interconference games, CBS would broadcast them if the visiting team was from the NFC and NBC would carry them when the visitors were from the AFC. This was in line with the NFL television blackout rules of the time, meaning that every televised game of a local NFL team would be on the same channel (at the time, home games were banned from local television regardless of sell-out status, while road games are required to be aired in the teams' primary media markets, and select neighboring markets as well, even if it is not the most popular team in the market). The two networks also divided up broadcast rights to the Super Bowl on a yearly rotation.

By 1971, the Federal Communications Commission (FCC) introduced the Prime Time Access Rule, which freed local network affiliates in the top 50 markets (in practice, the entire network) to take a half-hour of prime time from the networks on Mondays through Saturdays and one full hour on Sundays. Because nearly all affiliates found production costs for the FCC's intended goal of increased public affairs programming very high and the ratings (and by association, advertising revenues) low, making it mostly unprofitable, the FCC created an exception for network-authored news and public affairs. After a six-month hiatus in late 1971, CBS would find a prime place for 60 Minutes in a portion of that displaced time, 6:00 to 7:00 p.m. (Eastern; 5:00 to 6:00 Central Time) on Sundays, in January 1972. This proved somewhat less than satisfactory, however, because in order to accommodate CBS' telecasts of late afternoon National Football League games, 60 Minutes went on hiatus during the fall from 1972 to 1975 (and the summer of 1972). This took place because football telecasts were protected contractually from interruptions in the wake of the infamous "Heidi Game" incident on NBC in November 1968.

Due largely to CBS' live broadcast of NFL games, as well as other sports events aired by the network that run past their scheduled end time, 60 Minutes sometimes does not start until after 7:00 p.m. Eastern Time, with the program starting right after the conclusion of game coverage (however, on the West Coast, because the actual end of the live games is much earlier in the afternoon in comparison to the Eastern and Central Time Zones, 60 Minutes is always able to start at its normal 7:00 p.m. Pacific start time, leaving affiliates free to broadcast local newscasts, the CBS Evening News, and other local or syndicated programming leading up to 60 Minutes). The program's success has also led CBS Sports to schedule events leading into 60 Minutes and the rest of the network's primetime lineup, causing (again, except on the West Coast) the pre-emptions of the Sunday editions of the CBS Evening News and affiliates' local newscasts.

On January 16, 1972, the Dallas Cowboys defeated the Miami Dolphins 24–3 in Super Bowl VI in New Orleans. The CBS telecast had an estimated household viewership of 27,450,000 homes, the highest-rated single-day telecast ever at the time. Although Tulane Stadium was sold out for the game, unconditional blackout rules in the NFL prohibited the live telecast from being shown in the New Orleans market. This would be the last Super Bowl to be blacked out in the television market in which the game was played. The following year, the NFL allowed Super Bowl VII to be televised live in the host city (Los Angeles) when all tickets were sold. In 1973, the NFL changed its blackout policy to allow games to be broadcast in the home team's market if tickets are sold out 72 hours in advance (all Super Bowls since the second have sold out, as it is the main event on the NFL schedule, and there is high demand for Super Bowl tickets).

==== Labor disputes ====
A CBS technicians strike in 1972 disrupted coverage of numerous NFL games. Some games were covered by local television crews, while some were not seen at all. The scheduled commentators for CBS did not cross the picket lines and instead, CBS had to scramble to substitute announcers. Billy Joe Patton and even the head of CBS Sports, Bill MacPhail, were among those that filled in. According to the New York Times, the cut cables were discovered around noon. When CBS emergency crews (made up of supervisors) tried to bring other cables in from two trucks parked outside the stadium, a New York City cop saw a striking CBS technician trying to pry loose a cable that was hooked up to one of the trucks. At this point, the cop attempted to arrest the technician, but two of the latter's cohorts got involved, with a "scuffle" then breaking out. The first technician was arrested for criminal tampering, while the other two got hauled in on a host of other charges. CBS presumably figured it would be impossible to avoid having it happen again (although the strikers reportedly only numbered 25), so they just canceled the broadcast.

Interestingly, the San Francisco-Green Bay game at Milwaukee also had nine television cables cut, but the picture was only out for eight minutes at the start of the second half. Finally, in the Los Angeles-Atlanta game (called by Jack Drees, George Connor, and Gil Stratton), there were no replays because they had two less cameras in use because of the strike. That Sunday, CBS was also forced to preempt Face the Nation because of the strike, which is notable because it came just two days before the Presidential election.

Also in Week 8 of the 1972 season, the Dallas-San Diego game was seen on a regional basis in Texas. Bill Mercer and Dick Risenhoover were the commentators for this game. No CBS network personnel worked this game, though it appears several CBS affiliates did cover the game. Meanwhile, that week's Green Bay-Chicago game was covered by about five or six CBS affiliates in Wisconsin and a Michigan CBS affiliate in the Upper Peninsula. While the game actually was done by WBAY, the channel fed the game to WISN in Milwaukee, who then distributed the game on a closed-circuit feed to the other outlets. Bruce Roberts was not a part of the crew which was otherwise composed of Jack Whitaker and Jim Morse. The Week 11 Minnesota-Pittsburgh game was called by Jack Drees and George Connor with Andy Musser in CBS Control. CBS canceled the telecast for this the Philadelphia-New York game in Week 11. The International Brotherhood of Electrical Workers had disrupted a couple of earlier telecasts from New York and CBS did not want any more hassle. WPVI (an ABC affiliate) in Philadelphia purchased the rights for this game. Abruptly on the day before the game, WPVI canceled the telecast (the Eagles lost 62–10).

The scheduled telecasts of two New York Jets home games, Week 8 vs. Washington and week 12 vs. New Orleans, were cancelled due to the labor dispute.

==== Simulcasts in the San Francisco Bay Area and other experiments ====
On November 4, 1973, local San Francisco CBS affiliate KPIX (now an owned-and-operated station of the network) experimented with a "simulcast" in which the station kept switching back and forth between the network's broadcasts of a San Francisco 49ers game (against the Detroit Lions) and an Oakland Raiders game (against the New York Giants) that were being played at the same time, with frequent cuts to studio host Barry Tompkins. The station received many complaints from viewers, however, and the experiment was not repeated. This resulted in the NFL instituting new rules for markets that had two teams, which basically state that teams televised in two markets must play their games at different times in the day or week, or one of the teams must be on the road, or the teams' games must be on different networks. (For example, an NFL schedule for a given week in markets with two team franchises might look like this: Los Angeles Rams at Kansas City, 1:00 p.m.; New York Giants at Philadelphia, 1:00 p.m.; Los Angeles Chargers at San Francisco, 4:15 p.m.; and New England at New York Jets, 8:00 p.m.)

==== The NFL Today debuts ====
In 1975, CBS debuted The NFL Today, a pre-game show originally hosted by journalist Brent Musburger and former NFL player Irv Cross, with former Miss America Phyllis George serving as one of the reporters. Jimmy "The Greek" Snyder joined the program in 1976 but was dismissed by the network in January 1988 after making comments about racial differences among NFL players on Martin Luther King, Jr. Day. George was replaced by Jayne Kennedy for the 1978 season, only for Kennedy to depart at the end of the following season. George returned in 1980 and stayed on through the 1983 season, after which she was replaced by Charlsie Cantey. In 1979, the first year that the Sports Emmy Awards were awarded to sportscasts, The NFL Today was among the recipients.

==== Soundtracks, new graphics, and record Super Bowl ratings ====
By 1975, CBS used several themes (technically, CBS had different opening songs and graphics per crew) to open their broadcasts, ranging from David Shire's "Manhattan Skyline" from the Saturday Night Fever soundtrack to "Fly, Robin, Fly" by the Silver Convention. Around this time, Electric Light Orchestra's "Fire on High" was also used as a lead-in to the broadcast.

CBS' 1976 telecast of Super Bowl X between the Pittsburgh Steelers and Dallas Cowboys was viewed by an estimated 80 million people, the largest television audience in history at the time. CBS' telecast featured play-by-play announcer Pat Summerall (calling his first Super Bowl in that role) and color commentator Tom Brookshier.

On October 12, 1976, Commissioner Pete Rozelle negotiated contracts with the three television networks to televise all NFL regular-season and postseason games, as well as selected preseason games, for four years beginning with the 1978 season. ABC was awarded yearly rights to 16 Monday night games, four prime time games, the AFC-NFC Pro Bowl, and the Hall of Fame Games. CBS received the rights to all NFC regular season and postseason games (except those in the ABC package) and to Super Bowls XIV and XVI. NBC received the rights to all AFC regular season and postseason games (except those in the ABC package) and to Super Bowls XIII and XV. Industry sources considered it the largest single television package ever negotiated.

At the height of the disco fad, from 1977 to 1979, CBS used Meco's "Star Wars Theme/Cantina Band," a disco arrangement of John Williams's theme from Star Wars, as a musical theme.

Vin Scully and Alex Hawkins were assigned to call the 1977 NFC Championship Game between the Dallas Cowboys and Minnesota Vikings. Late in that game, Hawkins quipped as Roger Staubach was shown running off the field "You know, Vin, that Roger Staubach runs like a sissy." Scully responded by remarking "You know, Hawk, they tell me you didn't always wear your helmet when you played!" CBS Sports fired Hawkins the day after the game.

On January 15, 1978, the Dallas Cowboys defeated the Denver Broncos in Super Bowl XII in front of the largest audience ever to watch a sporting event. CBS scored a 47.2/67 national household rating/share, the highest-rated Super Bowl to date. This game was the first Super Bowl to be played in prime time, was broadcast in the United States by CBS with play-by-play announcer Pat Summerall and color commentator Tom Brookshier. The game kicked off at 5:17 p.m. Central Standard Time. Hosting the coverage was The NFL Today hosts Brent Musburger; Irv Cross; Phyllis George (in the last game of her first stint on The NFL Today before leaving to host the short-lived People the following season). Also contributing were Hank Stram (who had recently been fired by the New Orleans Saints); Jimmy "The Greek" Snyder; Sonny Jurgensen (working on CBS Radio coverage); Gary Bender; Paul Hornung; Nick Buoniconti and Jack Whitaker. Buoniconti and Hornung served as sideline reporters; with Hornung doing postgame interviews in the Broncos' locker room; while Bender covered the trophy presentation in the Cowboy locker room. An interesting aspect was the use of what was called an Electronic Palette graphics system (created by CBS and Ampex) for a painting-like aspect to several visual graphics; such as the game intro, starting lineups and bumpers going into or coming out of a commercial break. CBS would also unveil what was known as the "Action Track"; showing the trail of a football that had been kicked during replays. Also, when the planned lead-in (the Phoenix Open golf tournament) was halted due to poor weather, CBS Sports president Robert Wussler (in New York) and producer Barry Frank (at the Superdome) ended up filling the time period with an impromptu look at how the game would be produced.

1978 was Don Criqui's last season with CBS before departing for NBC; he was "traded" to NBC in exchange for network's longtime lead announcer Curt Gowdy. Criqui was, at the time prior to the trade, on the #5 team with Sonny Jurgensen and/or Nick Buoniconti. Criqui returned to CBS in 1998 after CBS regained NFL coverage by taking over the American Football Conference package. While calling the Eagles-Giants game at Giants Stadium with Jurgensen on November 19, 1978, Criqui was on hand for a fumble recovery by Philadelphia cornerback Herman Edwards that would become known as the "Miracle at the Meadowlands". With Giants victory all but assured, Criqui had begun to read the end credits for the game's control truck and on-field personnel shortly before the game's final play:

It's Giants football now, third and two. We thank our producer Bob Rowe, our director Jim Silman, and our CBS crew, spotter and statistician John Mara and Tom McHugh here at Giants Stadium. As the clock winds down on the Philadelphia Eagles, a game they thought would project them into a possible wildcard position, it would bring them 7–5 had they won, but a late interception by the Giants will preserve a Giant victory, an upset win as the Giants lead 17–12, we're inside 30 seconds, the Eagles have no timeouts. [At this point, the snap and fumble take place.] Wait a minute... here's a free fla- I don't believe it! The Eagles pick it up and Herman Edwards runs it in for a touchdown! An incredible development!

Also in 1978, CBS experimented with three-man booths during the first half of the season.

Pat Summerall and John Madden were paired together for the first time on the telecast of the Minnesota–Tampa Bay game on November 25, 1979. Madden substituted for Tom Brookshier, who was unavailable to work the telecast. Madden would also join Summerall and Brookshier for the Atlanta–Oakland game in Week 7. In Week 15, Summerall worked the Dallas–Philadelphia game on Saturday with Brookshier, then the Chicago–Green Bay game the next day with Sonny Jurgensen.

=== 1980s ===
In 1980, CBS, with a record bid of US$12 million, was awarded the national radio rights to broadcast 26 NFL regular season games, including Monday Night Football, and all ten postseason games through the 1983 season. Starting with the 1980 season, CBS frequently used the beginning guitar riff of Heart's "Crazy on You" for commercial break tosses. Television ratings for season and playoff broadcasts in 1980 were the second-best in NFL history, trailing only the combined ratings of the 1976 season. All three networks posted gains, and NBC's 15.0 rating was its best ever. CBS and ABC had also experienced their best NFL ratings since 1977, with 15.3 and 20.8 ratings, respectively. CBS Radio reported a record audience of 7 million listeners for Monday night and special games.

In 1981, ABC and CBS set all-time ratings highs, with ABC finishing the season with a 21.7 rating and CBS with a 17.5 rating; NBC was down slightly to 13.9. On October 18, 1981, Game 5 of the National League Championship Series between the Los Angeles Dodgers and Montreal Expos, which was supposed to be televised on NBC that Sunday afternoon, was postponed due to snow. The cancellation of that game allowed CBS to achieve record breaking television viewership levels for a regular-season professional football broadcast. It was rated as the most watched afternoon of regular-season NFL football broadcasts on a single network in television history.

In 1981, CBS introduced a new opening theme for the NFL games, a peppy, fanfare-styled theme (with a tempo reminiscent of the disco style still somewhat popular at the time) that remained in use until partway through the 1986 season. The patriotic-style opening title sequence showed the Stars and Stripes of the U.S. flag morphing into the words "National Football League." That same year, CBS Sports standardized its on-screen graphics for all of its telecasts; prior to this, each director in charge for each game used a different look. For the network's coverage of Super Bowl XVI at the end of that season, CBS' theme music eventually became the theme for CBS Sports Saturday/Sunday. The music itself, could be considered a hybrid of the theme used for The NFL Today at the time and the original theme for its college basketball broadcast; CBS would use this particular theme again at least for the NFC Championship Game at the end of the 1982 season.

==== The beginning of the Summerall-Madden era ====
Going into the 1981 NFL season, CBS Sports executives decided that John Madden, who had joined the network in 1979 and had worked with Frank Glieber and Gary Bender (as previously mentioned, Pat Summerall and Madden were first teamed on a November 25, 1979 broadcast of a Minnesota Vikings–Tampa Bay Buccaneers game) in his first two years, was going to be their star NFL color commentator – however, they had trouble figuring out who was going to be his play-by-play partner. At the time CBS had reshuffled their #1 team lineup as Summerall's longtime broadcast partner Tom Brookshier was moved into a play-by-play role (teamed with former Detroit Lions legend Wayne Walker, at the time the sports director for CBS affiliate KPIX), and it was not immediately clear if Summerall was going to keep his position or if #2 play-by-play man Vin Scully, whose contract was nearing expiration, was going to be promoted to take over. CBS elected to give both Summerall and Scully chances to work with Madden. They were able to pull this off rather easily; both Summerall and Scully had obligations that overlapped with football, with Summerall leading CBS’ coverage of the US Open tennis tournament and Scully being the lead voice for CBS Radio's coverage of the Major League Baseball postseason. Thus, Madden was paired with Scully on weeks Summerall was unavailable and vice versa. The decision was made to pair Summerall with Madden, beginning a nearly two-decade long partnership. Scully stayed with CBS through 1982, joining NBC the following year to serve as their primary play-by-play announcer for Major League Baseball and golf broadcasts; however, he never called NFL games for the network.

Director Sandy Grossman began working alongside John Madden and Pat Summerall on CBS in 1981, and their partnership lasted 21 seasons. Madden insisted that Grossman and producer Bob Stenner watch coaches’ films of the NFL teams, which helped Grossman choose the best shots to pair with Madden's commentary. Madden credits him for being the first director to widen the camera shot to incorporate footage of outside linebackers. He created these broadcasts out of a production truck crammed with television monitors that formed a screen shot. During a New York Giants-Cincinnati Bengals game in 1991, Stenner and Grossman made 1,100 decisions about camera angles and the like.

On January 24, 1982, CBS Sports' broadcast of Super Bowl XVI – in which the San Francisco 49ers (led by quarterback Joe Montana) defeated the Cincinnati Bengals, 26–21 – became the highest rated Super Bowl of all time, with a 49.1 rating/73 share. Summerall and Madden called their first Super Bowl together as they went on to become one of the most popular NFL announcing teams ever. During the Super Bowl XVI telecast, the telestrator made its major network debut, which the network introduced as the "CBS Chalkboard" during their sports coverage. Madden utilized the device effectively to diagram football plays on-air to viewers. The telestrator is generally credited with popularizing the use of "telestration" during sports commentary.

In 1982, the NFL signed a five-year contract with the three television networks (ABC, CBS and NBC) to televise all NFL regular season and postseason games starting with the 1982 season.

==== 1982 NFL strike ====
During the 1982 season, the NFL allowed CBS to rebroadcast Super Bowl XVI during the first Sunday of the strike. CBS also rebroadcast their most recent Super Bowl (XXI) telecast during the 1987 strike. Also during the 1982 strike, CBS' NCAA football contract required the network to show four Division III games; the network initially intended to show those games on Saturday afternoons, with the broadcasts being received only in markets that were interested in carrying them. However, with no NFL games to show on October 3, 1982 (on what would have been Week 5 of the NFL season) due to the strike, CBS decided to show all of its NCAA Division III games on a single Sunday afternoon in front of a mass audience.

CBS originally wanted to air some Division I-A games on Sunday. However, according to Sports Illustrated, fellow NCAA football rights holders ABC and WTBS refused to sign off on the idea. Both networks demanded that CBS pay more in rights fees if it showed additional games. WTBS also objected to CBS moving games from Saturday to Sunday due to fears that such games would steal viewers from the NFLPA All-Star Games that WTBS planned to air. When the red tape made showing big time college football too difficult to pull off, CBS got the idea to run Division III games on that Sunday.

On January 8, 1983, CBS began their coverage of the NFL playoffs. As a consequence to the strike, which shortened the regular season from a 16-game schedule to only 9 games, a special 16-team playoff format (which was dubbed the "Super Bowl Tournament") was instituted. Geographical divisional standings were ignored and instead, the top eight teams from each conference were seeded 1–8 based on their regular season records. Ultimately, this resulted in the early round playoff games being regionally televised for the first and to date, only time.

==== Announcer shifts ====
Tom Brookshier was suspended for the final week of the 1983 season after commenting during a promo for an NCAA basketball game (during Week 15's Saints-Eagles game alongside Charlie Waters) between the Louisville Cardinals and North Carolina State Wolfpack that the Louisville starting five (which happened to be all black) "had a collective IQ of about 40". Brookshier eventually apologized and was reinstated for the 1984 NFL season.

For the 1985 season, the NFL showed a ratings increase on all three networks for the season, with viewership of CBS' telecasts increasing by 10%, NBC telecasts by 4%, and ABC telecasts by 16%.

Beginning in Week 4 of the 1986 season, CBS adapted a theme for its game broadcast, an intense, kinetic, synthesizer-laced theme that has affectionately been referred to as "Pots and Pans" (because of the background notes that often resembled the banging of those particular cooking objects). In 1989, the "Pots and Pans" theme was revamped to give it a more smooth, electronic style. This theme was also known for integrating the play-by-play announcer's voice-over introduction into the theme, it integrated three voice-over segments, one for the visiting team, home team and game storyline to set the latter element into the broadcast; this practice was common with CBS Sports' themes of the 1980s.

==== CBS starts broadcasting in stereo ====
CBS' broadcast of Super Bowl XXI (at the end of the 1986 season) was the first NFL game to be broadcast in Dolby Surround sound and in stereo. The postgame show was supposed to feature the song "One Shining Moment", but due to the extended length of the postgame interviews, CBS did not play it. The lyrics to the song, which is now played at the end of the network's NCAA Men's Division I Basketball Championship coverage, were ultimately changed from "the ball is kicked" to "the ball is tipped". CBS also debuted the theme music (composed by Lloyd Landesman) that ultimately became the theme used for CBS' college football coverage (which was also the case for the theme CBS used from 1984 to 1986 after debuting it for Super Bowl XVIII) for the 1987 season (this theme was actually loosely based on the Pots and Pans theme).

At the NFL's annual meeting in Maui, Hawaii on March 15, 1987, Commissioner Pete Rozelle and Broadcast Committee Chairman Art Modell announced new three-year television contracts with ABC, CBS, and NBC, effective with the 1987 season. Beginning in 1987, CBS started broadcasting NFL games in stereo. On December 8, 1987, Cathy Barreto became the first woman to direct an NFL game at the network television level for the Minnesota Vikings–Detroit Lions telecast. On April 18, 1989, the NFL and CBS Radio jointly announced agreement extending CBS' radio broadcast rights to an annual 40-game package through the 1994 season.

==== The Fog Bowl and the first Turkey Leg Award ====
On New Year's Eve, 1988, CBS was at Chicago's Soldier Field for a playoff game between the Philadelphia Eagles and Chicago Bears. During the second quarter, a dense fog rolled over, cutting visibility to about 15–20 yards for the rest of the game. Television and radio announcers, and the fans in the stadium had trouble seeing what was happening on the field. A CBS helicopter providing aerial coverage for the game was forced to land. Terry Bradshaw, who was working the game with Verne Lundquist, later said he was more frustrated than at any time when he was a player.

For the Thanksgiving game broadcasts on November 23, 1989, John Madden awarded the first "Turkey Leg Award", for the annual game's most valuable player. Reggie White of the Philadelphia Eagles was the first recipient of the honor for his part in what would become known as Bounty Bowl I. The gesture was seen mostly as a humorous gimmick relating to Madden's famous multi-legged turkeys served on Thanksgiving. Since then, however, the award has gained subtle notoriety, and currently, each year an MVP has been chosen for both the CBS and Fox games. When CBS returned to the NFL in 1998, the network introduced their own award, the "All-Iron Award."

=== 1990s ===
For CBS' coverage of Super Bowl XXIV at the end of the 1989 season, CBS introduced a brand new theme for its NFL broadcasts, using a considerably more traditional and standard (but still peppy and bombastic) theme than the one used the previous four seasons; the theme was used until the 1991 NFC Championship Game.

On March 12, 1990, at the NFL's annual meeting in Orlando, Florida, the league ratified new four-year television agreements with existing partners ABC, CBS and NBC, as well as newly struck cable agreements with ESPN and TNT, to take effect with the 1990–1993 seasons. The contracts involving the four networks totaled US$3.6 billion, the largest in television history.

On September 9, 1990, The NFL Today overhauled its talent lineup, consisting of Greg Gumbel, Terry Bradshaw, Pat O'Brien and Lesley Visser. Gumbel and Bradshaw replaced Brent Musburger, who was fired by CBS on April 1, 1990, and Irv Cross, who was demoted to the position of game analyst alongside Tim Ryan on play-by-play. During the 1990 season, Pat Summerall was hospitalized after vomiting on a plane during a flight after a Chicago Bears–Washington Redskins game, and was out for a considerable amount of time. While Verne Lundquist replaced Summerall on games with Madden, Jack Buck (who was at CBS during the time as the network's lead Major League Baseball announcer) was added as a regular NFL broadcaster to fill-in.

==== CBS broadcasts its final Super Bowl as the NFC package holder ====
At Super Bowl XXVI, Lesley Visser became the first female sportscaster to preside over the Vince Lombardi Trophy presentation ceremony. The network's telecast of Super Bowl XXVI on January 26, 1992, was seen by more than 123 million viewers nationally, second only to the 127 million that viewed Super Bowl XX. The ongoing 1990 television contract gave CBS rights to Super Bowl XXVI instead of Super Bowl XXVII, which was in the network's rotation of the champion game. The NFL swapped the years in which CBS and NBC held rights to the Super Bowl in an effort to give CBS enough lead-in programming for the upcoming 1992 Winter Olympics that were set to begin two weeks later. For this game, CBS debuted a new network-wide red, white and blue graphics package as well as a new theme song (composed by Frankie Vinci) for its NFL coverage that replaced the one CBS debuted for its coverage of Super Bowl XXIV two years earlier. The package lasted until the end of 1995, after which CBS discarded it in favor of an orange and yellow color scheme for its sports graphics. The new music lasted until CBS lost the NFL rights at the end of the 1993 season, but continued to be used by CBS Radio until 2002. Several remixed versions of the 1993 theme were used upon the return of the NFL to CBS until the end of the 2002 season, when CBS replaced its entire NFL music package with one composed by E.S. Posthumus.

To compete with the halftime show (which featured a halftime show entitled "Winter Magic", a Winter Olympics-themed show starring Gloria Estefan, Brian Boitano, and Dorothy Hamill to tie into CBS's upcoming broadcast of the Games), Fox decided to broadcast a special live episode of In Living Color and was able to attract and keep Super Bowl viewers. The live episode featured football-themed sketches (such as Men on Football), a performance by Color Me Badd, and a clock counting down to the start of the third quarter. The episode was sponsored by Frito-Lay, who paid $2 million to hold all national advertising time, and to help budget and promote the special; the effort included a $1 million giveaway, whose winner was announced during the broadcast. A CBS executive felt that the concept was "cute", but dismissed concerns that the ambush would have any major impact on the viewership of the Super Bowl. The special drew 20 to 25 million viewers away from the Super Bowl; Nielsen estimated that CBS lost 10 ratings points during halftime as a result of the special. It was decided that Michael Jackson would perform at halftime during Super Bowl XXVII, followed by more big-name talent during subsequent Super Bowl halftimes in order to maintain Super Bowl viewership.

In September 1993, The NFL Today celebrated its 19th season as a half-hour pre-game show. It was the highest-rated program in its time slot for 18 years, longer than any other program on television.

==== Losing the NFL to Fox (1994–1997) ====
The steady downturn in programming fortunes related to the struggling U.S. economy and a dearth of new primetime hit shows that CBS experienced during the tenure of network president Laurence Tisch (brother of New York Giants co-owner Bob Tisch) would precipitate in 1993. As the television contracts for both NFL conferences and for the Sunday and Monday prime time football packages came up for renewal, the Fox Broadcasting Company – which made a failed attempt at acquiring the Monday Night Football package six years earlier – made an aggressive move to acquire the league television rights. CBS' initial plan was to offer the NFL $250 million per year for a long-term deal, which would have amounted to a $15 million rate cut to the league; NFL TV Committee Chairman Art Modell and other longtime owners wanted to accept the deal, but the furious rebuttal by Dallas Cowboys owner Jerry Jones and Denver Broncos owner Pat Bowlen led the committee to reject the offer and force CBS to resubmit. Knowing that it would likely need to bid considerably more than the incumbent networks to acquire a piece of the package, Fox placed a then-record bid of US$1.58 billion for the four-year contract for the broadcast rights to the National Football Conference, significantly exceeding CBS' bid for each year of the contract (Laurence Tisch had agreed to increase CBS' offer to $295 million a year, but was stunned by the almost-$400 million Fox bid and told his executives CBS would not exercise its right to match the Fox offer to keep the NFL coverage in-network). The NFC was considered the more desirable conference at the time due to its presence in most of the largest U.S. markets, such as New York City, Chicago, Dallas, Philadelphia, and San Francisco.

The NFL accepted Fox's bid on December 18, 1993, giving Fox rights to televise NFC regular season and playoff games effective with the 1994 season, as well as the exclusive U.S. television rights to Super Bowl XXXI (held in 1997) under the initial contract. This stripped CBS of NFL telecasts following the 1993 season after 38 years, resulting in CBS not broadcasting any NFL games for the next four years. The Fox network had only debuted seven years earlier and did not have an existing sports division; however, it would establish its own sports division and began building its own coverage by hiring many former CBS personalities (such as Pat Summerall, John Madden, James Brown, Terry Bradshaw, Dick Stockton and Matt Millen), management and production personnel.

The acquisition of NFL rights by Fox made that network a major player in American television by giving it many new viewers (and affiliates) and a platform to advertise its other programs. In the meantime, CBS lost several affiliates, and ratings for its other programming languished. On May 23, 1994, News Corporation, then parent of Fox, struck an alliance with New World Communications, by now a key ownership group with several VHF affiliates of the three established major networks – most of which were CBS affiliates, almost all of which were located in NFC markets – and wary of a CBS without football. Through the deal, in which Fox purchased a 20% interest in New World, the company signed an agreement to affiliate the majority of its stations (including those that New World was in the process of acquiring from Argyle Communications and Citicasters) with Fox; twelve of New World's stations began switching their affiliations to Fox beginning in September 1994 and continuing through September 1996.

CBS apparently underestimated the value of its rights with respect to its advertising revenues and to its promotional opportunities for other network programs. To this day, CBS admits that it has never fully recovered from the loss of key affiliates through the New World-Fox deal. It took a particularly severe hit in Atlanta, Detroit and Milwaukee, as the network found itself on the verge of having to import the signals of nearby affiliates via cable and satellite after being turned down for affiliation deals by other major network stations in those markets. Ultimately, the network was relegated to UHF stations with marginal signals in certain areas within their markets (because of satellite television, the NFL Sunday Ticket in local markets, and rules of the time, satellite subscribers were required to use antennas to pick up local affiliates). CBS purchased one of these stations, WWJ-TV (channel 62), only days before its longtime Detroit affiliate, WJBK (channel 2), was set to switch to Fox. The ratings impact in these three markets was significant; the former CBS affiliates were all considered to be ratings contenders, especially during the NFL season. With CBS ending up on UHF stations that had virtually no significant history as a former Fox or first-tier independent station (or former Big Three affiliate for that matter), ratings for CBS programming in these markets declined significantly. In Milwaukee, for instance, WITI (channel 6)'s switch from CBS to Fox resulted in several of CBS' remaining sports properties, most notably the Daytona 500, not being available to cable subscribers for much of 1995 until Weigel Broadcasting signed carriage agreements with providers to add new CBS station WDJT-TV (channel 58).The vast resources of Fox founder Rupert Murdoch allowed that network to grow quickly, primarily to the detriment of CBS. The loss of the NFL came in part because CBS Sports suddenly went into cost-cutting mode in the wake of its money-bleeding, $1 billion deal with Major League Baseball (1990–1993). The network had already developed a stodgy and overly budgeted image under Laurence Tisch, who had become chief executive officer of CBS in 1985. Tisch was already notorious for having made deep cuts at the network's news division and for selling off major portions of the company (such as the 1988 sale of its Columbia Records division to Sony).

When CBS lost the NFL to Fox, the "Tiffany Network" struggled to compete in the ratings with a slate of programming whose audiences skewed older than programs broadcast by the other networks, even though the network still finished ahead of Fox, whose programming at the time of the NFL deal was almost exclusively limited to primetime and children's programming. One of the few bright spots in terms of ratings and audience demographics for CBS in the Tisch era, the Late Show with David Letterman (which often dominated The Tonight Show with Jay Leno in its first two years) saw its ratings decline in large part due to the affiliation switches, at times even finishing third behind Nightline on ABC.

CBS televised its last game as the rights holder of the NFC package on January 23, 1994, when the Dallas Cowboys defeated the San Francisco 49ers in the 1993 NFC Championship Game, 38–21.

I'll tell you the tough thing, the tough thing is to say goodbye for so many thousands of people throughout the years that CBS has been carrying National Football League action. So many men and women, so many talented men and women who have combined their efforts in order to bring you what you know is quality football coverage ever since it began 38 years ago, they shouldn't be forgotten. And they have established a legacy that we are very much, very proud to be a part of. For Pat and John, for Jim Gray and Lesley Visser and Matt Millen and for my friend Terry Bradshaw, I'm Greg Gumbel. Thank you everyone and goodnight.

— The NFL Today host Greg Gumbel signing off at the end of CBS' coverage of the 1993 NFC Championship Game on January 23, 1994.

After NFL Today hosts Greg Gumbel and Terry Bradshaw signed off for one last time, CBS aired a photo montage of their most memorable moments during their 38 years of covering the NFL. The montage itself was set to the instrumental tune "After the Sunrise" by Yanni.

==== Attempts at replacement programming ====
CBS made a bid on National Hockey League (NHL) rights in the wake of the loss of the NFL contract, but in a stunning blow to CBS, Fox outbid them for those rights as well. The replacement programming CBS ended up airing on Sunday afternoons in the fall of 1994 and 1995 involved mostly a package of encore made-for-TV movies under the umbrella title CBS Sunday Afternoon Showcase, which were targeted towards women in an attempt to counterprogram NBC and Fox. However, they made very little headway with some affiliates forgoing the movie package altogether and instead airing either, local and/or religious programs, professional wrestling and syndicated television shows such as Highlander: The Series; by 1996, CBS picked up additional NASCAR Winston Cup, Busch Series and Craftsman Truck races in order to compete in some form.

In 1994, CBS had a new series of boxing bouts on Saturday or Sundays under the Eye on Sports banner. CBS continued airing boxing on a somewhat regular basis until 1998, by which time they had the NFL (after acquiring the American Football Conference (AFC) package from NBC) and college football back on their slate.

One of the often cited reasons for the Canadian Football League's failed American experiment, and part of the reason why the CFL fell behind the NFL in terms of quality players, was the state of the league's American television contract. The league, which had held a U.S. network television contract in the 1950s and again briefly in 1982, was then being carried on ESPN2, at the time a nascent channel devoted to extreme sports that was not nearly as widely available as its parent network and only carried a limited number of the league's games (with ESPN itself airing some games to fill in airtime available due to the 1994 Major League Baseball strike, as well as the Grey Cup on tape delay). It was not until after the 1995 season that the CFL, mainly through the action of its American franchises, approached CBS to see if it could get coverage. However, by the time negotiations started, the CFL had decided to fold or relocate all of its American franchises, and the negotiations with CBS accordingly fell through. It would not be until several years later that the CFL reached a television contract in the United States, on a much smaller network (America One).

The following year, in 1996, CBS added college football games featuring the Southeastern and Big East conferences on Saturday afternoons. It was the beginning of a rebuilding process that would eventually lead to the return of the NFL to CBS.

==== The NFL returns ====
Neal Pilson, former president of CBS Sports, said that "Four years later the negative impact was so severe that CBS went to the NFL and said, 'Name your price and we'll pay whatever to get a package' ... We lost affiliates, ratings, the male audience and a lot of sports sponsorships." In November 1996, Sean McManus (son of ABC Sports broadcast legend Jim McKay and protégé of longtime ABC Sports executive Roone Arledge) was named President of CBS Sports, and would lead CBS' efforts in re-acquiring broadcast rights to the NFL. On January 12, 1998, CBS agreed to a contract with the NFL to broadcast American Football Conference (AFC) games effective with the 1998 season (taking over the rights from NBC), paying $4 billion over eight years ($500 million per season). In the last year NBC had rights to the AFC, the Denver Broncos, an original AFL team, defeated the Green Bay Packers in Super Bowl XXXII, which aired on NBC and ended a 13-year drought against the NFC in the Super Bowl. Around the time CBS took over the rights to the AFC saw the trend of the 1980s and 1990s reverse, in that the AFC became the dominant conference over the NFC (1998 also saw the Broncos win their second consecutive Super Bowl). The New England Patriots dynasty in the 2000s in the only AFC-only top-ten market also contributed to the ratings surge. In fact, the primary stations for both the Broncos and Patriots are the same – KCNC-TV in Denver, and WBZ-TV in Boston, prior to the two stations switching to CBS in 1995 through the network's affiliation deal with Westinghouse – as when NBC carried the AFC (KUSA and WHDH-TV, which is now an independent station, carried those teams' games from 1995 to 1998).

In addition, the current AFC deal also saw CBS indirectly acquire rights to air most games played by the Pittsburgh Steelers, which air locally on KDKA-TV (a longtime CBS affiliate, which became a CBS O&O after parent company Westinghouse Electric Corporation bought CBS in late 1995 and has long been one of CBS's strongest stations) and often get the highest television ratings for an NFL franchise due to the team's rabid fanbase on a national level. Coincidentally, before the AFL–NFL merger (when the Steelers went to the AFC voluntarily to balance out the number of teams between conferences), Steelers road games had aired on KDKA-TV as part of the network's deal to air NFL games, while league rules at the time mandated that home games could not be televised at all during this period, even if they did sell out tickets.

After acquiring the new package, CBS Sports then named former NFL Today host Greg Gumbel, as their lead play-by-play announcer (Gumbel had moved to NBC Sports, where he worked from 1994 to 1998 after CBS lost the NFL to Fox). Phil Simms (who at the time, was at NBC as part of the lead announcing team alongside Dick Enberg and Paul Maguire) was hired as the lead color commentator. On September 6, 1998, after 1,687 days since the last broadcast of The NFL Today, host Jim Nantz welcomed back viewers to CBS for its coverage of the NFL.

Given the challenge of making its coverage of the AFC different from that of NBC, CBS passed over longtime NBC veterans Charlie Jones and Bob Trumpy in favor of newcomers such as Ian Eagle and Steve Tasker. According to CBS Sports executive producer Terry Ewert, "We wanted to forge our own way and go in a different direction. We wanted to make decisions on a new way of looking at things." In one stark difference from NBC, CBS used a score and clock graphic for its NFL games that was constant during the game broadcasts outside of break tosses, a la the FoxBox. CBS' contribution was dubbed the EyeBox.

"When CBS got the NFL back (in 1997), everything picked up again," Pilson said. On November 8, 1998, CBS televised the first NFL game to be broadcast in high-definition, between the New York Jets and Buffalo Bills at Giants Stadium. It was also the first time two Heisman Trophy winning quarterbacks started against each other in the NFL (Vinny Testaverde for the Jets and Doug Flutie for the Bills).

=== 2000s ===
On January 28, 2001, CBS Sports, Core Digital and Princeton Video Image introduced state-of-the-art, three-dimensional replay technology called "EyeVision" for its coverage of Super Bowl XXXV in Tampa (at Raymond James Stadium). The game, CBS Sports' first Super Bowl broadcast since 1992, drew 131.2 million viewers for the Baltimore Ravens' win over the New York Giants. As a result, Super Bowl XXXV was the most watched television program that year. Play-by-play announcer Greg Gumbel became the first African-American announcer to call a major sports championship; he was joined in the broadcast booth with Phil Simms. Both of the Ravens' Super Bowl championships to date have been on CBS; the CBS-owned station in Baltimore, WJZ-TV, had been, as an ABC affiliate, one of the strongest television stations for Monday Night Football for most of the 1980s and early 1990s, due to Baltimore's previous NFL team, the Colts' move to Indianapolis.

The 2001–02 NFL playoffs marked the first time that the league scheduled prime time playoff games for the first two rounds, in an attempt to attract more viewers. Saturday wild card and divisional playoff games were moved from 12:30 and 4 p.m. Eastern Time to 4:30 and 8 p.m., respectively. As a result, the league abandoned its practice of scheduling playoff games held mainly in colder, northern regions for daylight hours only; any stadium, regardless of evening January temperatures, could host prime time playoff games.

==== Jim Nantz and Greg Gumbel swap roles ====
In 2004, Jim Nantz and Greg Gumbel swapped roles on CBS's NFL broadcasts. Nantz took Gumbel's place as the lead play-by-play announcer while Gumbel took Nantz's spot as the host of The NFL Today. Following the 2005 season, CBS discontinued the use of sideline reporters in its regular season NFL coverage until 2014.

In Week 1, the Tennessee Titans-Miami Dolphins game was moved a day earlier due to the threat of Hurricane Ivan. As per Dick Enberg's US Open duties, he was filled in on play-by-play by Dan Dierdorf, while Todd Blackledge provided color commentary. Two weeks later, the Dolphins' game against the Pittsburgh Steelers was pushed to 8:30 p.m. Eastern Time because of Hurricane Jeanne. The game aired on the CBS and UPN affiliates in both Pittsburgh and Miami.

In the 2005 season, the game between the Kansas City Chiefs and the Miami Doplhins was moved two days earlier from its originally scheduled date due to the threat of Hurricane Wilma. The game aired in the local markets of the two teams.

The next group of broadcast contracts, which began with the 2006–07 season, resulted in a size-able increase in total rights fees. Both Fox and CBS renewed their Sunday afternoon broadcast packages through 2011, in both cases with modest increases. On February 6, 2006, CBS Sports announced the return of James Brown, who left CBS eleven years earlier to become studio host of Fox NFL Sunday, to the network as the host of The NFL Today. Greg Gumbel moved back to play-by-play, teaming with Dan Dierdorf. CBS decided to not feature sideline reports for the 2006 regular season. However, the network did use Lesley Visser, Sam Ryan, Solomon Wilcots and Steve Tasker to report from the sidelines and around the stadium for its telecast of Super Bowl XLI.

In the 2006 season, CBS' coverage of the 2006 AFC Championship Game between the New England Patriots and the Indianapolis Colts earned a 28.1 rating, which topped the season premiere of American Idol on Fox. Its Super Bowl XLI broadcast drew the third largest television audience in history, finishing behind only its broadcast of the M*A*S*H finale ("Goodbye, Farewell and Amen") in 1983 and NBC's broadcast of Super Bowl XXX (Dallas Cowboys and Pittsburgh Steelers) from 1996. Super Bowl XLI was the second most watched Super Bowl broadcast of all time, averaging 93.1 million viewers.

==== HDTV coverage ====
As late as 2006, CBS aired only three of its NFL games in high-definition each week, the same number of games it had aired for the past few seasons. The other networks that held rights to broadcast NFL games – NBC, NFL Network and ESPN – broadcast all of their games in high definition, and Fox broadcast up to six in HD. Because of this, some fans accused CBS of being "cheap." Beginning with the 2007 season, CBS began airing five of the Sunday games in high definition television on doubleheader weeks, and six on singleheader weeks.

Former CBS Sports Executive Vice President Tony Petitti (who left CBS in April 2008 to become the head of the newly established MLB Network) claimed the network would probably air all of its NFL games in high definition by 2009. When asked about the move, Petitti commented that CBS was focused on building a new studio for The NFL Today pre-game show. However, another CBS executive had previously indicated that, because CBS was an "early adopter" with its first HD game in 1998, it is already "at capacity" and would have to replace newly purchased equipment in its network center with even more expensive equipment. However, CBS did carry its entire slate of games in 2009 in HD, though a few non-essential camera positions for some games (mainly used only in analysis situations) continued to be shot in 4:3 SD.

Beginning with the 2013 season, CBS Sports switched to a 16:9 full widescreen presentation, which began requiring the use of the #10 Active Format Description tag to present the games in a letterboxed widescreen format for viewers watching on cable television through 4:3 television sets.

==== CBS introduces the "CBS Eye-lert" ====
For the 2007 season, CBS announced the advent of "CBS Eye-lert", a service that allows viewers to be notified via e-mail and text message when the start time of a program will be delayed. The "Eye-lert" was eventually extended on-air to a banner graphic that appears during the prime time lineup within sports broadcasts and segments of delayed regularly scheduled evening programs.

During Week 7 of the 2008 season, a power failure at Buffalo's Ralph Wilson Stadium caused problems leading to the regular broadcast team of Greg Gumbel and Dan Dierdorf being unable to call portions of the game (the Buffalo Bills vs. the San Diego Chargers). Video was still available, and so James Brown called portions of the game from the studio, with the rest of the NFL Today team providing color commentary.

=== 2010s ===
With an average U.S. audience of 106.5 million viewers, Super Bowl XLIV on CBS was, at the time, the most-watched Super Bowl telecast in the championship game's history as well as the most-watched program of any kind in American television history, beating the record previously set 27 years earlier by the final episode of M*A*S*H, which was watched by 105.97 million viewers. The game telecast drew an overnight national Nielsen rating of 46.4 with a 68 share, the highest for a Super Bowl since Super Bowl XX in 1986; and drew a 56.3 rating in New Orleans and a 54.2 rating in Indianapolis, first and fourth respectively among local markets. Super Bowl XLV surpassed the record a year later and was itself topped by Super Bowl XLVI in 2012.

On November 28, 2010, CBS broadcast its 5,000th NFL game.

On December 14, 2011, the NFL, along with Fox, NBC and CBS, announced a nine-year extension of the league's rights deal with all three networks to the end of the 2022 season. The extended contract includes the continued rotation of the Super Bowl yearly among the three networks, meaning CBS would air Super Bowls XLVII (2013), 50 (2016), LIII (2019), and LV (2021).

The late-afternoon regional games held on December 1, 2013 (Denver Broncos–Kansas City Chiefs and Cincinnati Bengals–San Diego Chargers) drew a 16.7 household rating, a 29 share, and 28.106 million viewers from 4:25 to 7:47 p.m. Eastern Time.

On November 24, 2014, CBS presented a special Monday night game between the New York Jets and the Buffalo Bills from Ford Field (which was moved from Ralph Wilson Stadium due to a major lake effect snowstorm that affected Western New York).

In 2017, Beth Mowins became the first woman ever to call a football game for CBS, when she called the Cleveland Browns-Indianapolis Colts game with Jay Feely in Week 3.

On the first Sunday of the NFL's 100th season, a power outage affecting a CBS Sports production truck stationed at TIAA Bank Field in Jacksonville, Florida for the Kansas City Chiefs-Jacksonville Jaguars regional broadcast forces the network to switch viewers, including those in Kansas City and Jacksonville, to other games. The initial explanation by NFL on CBS host James Brown was that the network was cutting away from the game for more competitive action (at the time of the outage the result was not in doubt, with the Chiefs leading 37-19 and eventually winning 40–26), but later revealed to be technical difficulties.

==== CBS broadcasts via a secondary audio program and the internet ====
For the 2012 NFL season, CBS began providing Spanish play-by-play commentary of all game broadcasts via a secondary audio program feed. Also in 2012, to further prevent issues surrounding late games from delaying prime-time programming on the east coast (also influenced by other recent changes slowing the pace of games, such as video reviews and the kickoff for late games being moved from 4:15 to 4:25 p.m. Eastern Time), CBS began to move the start of its prime-time schedule in the eastern and central times zones to 7:30 p.m./6:30 p.m. on weeks that the network carries a 4:25 p.m. game.

Super Bowl XLVII was broadcast for free on the internet on the host network's website, in this case CBSSports.com. CBS charged an average of $4 million for a 30-second commercial during the game, the highest rate for any Super Bowl. According to Nielsen, Super Bowl XLVII was watched by an estimated average total audience of 108.69 million U.S. viewers, with a record 164.1 million tuning into at least six minutes of the game.

==== 2014–2017: Thursday night games ====
In January 2014, reports surfaced that the NFL was shopping a selection of up to eight games from its Thursday Night Football package to other broadcasters, including the league's existing broadcast partners, along with Turner Sports. While the league was seeking either a cable or broadcast outlet, they were strongly considering the latter.

On February 5, 2014, it was announced that CBS would air eight, early-season Thursday night games during the 2014 NFL season in simulcast with NFL Network, with the remainder airing on NFL Network exclusively. CBS's team of Jim Nantz and Phil Simms handled commentary for all of the games, and CBS Sports produced all of the games in the package, including those on NFL Network, which would be produced in the manner of CBS telecasts. Tracy Wolfson would be the sideline reporter. Wolfson joined the NFL team on a permanent basis after working SEC games for CBS since 2004. She was replaced by Allie LaForce in that capacity. As a part of the contract, CBS was also allowed to broadcast a Saturday game in Week 16 for the first time since 2005.

On January 18, 2015, the NFL announced that CBS and the NFL Network would again partner, with the same broadcast schedule, during the 2015 NFL season. The contract is again only for one year, while CBS's Sunday contract is 12 years long. The contract was renewed for another two years for the 2016 and 2017 seasons, with the network load reduced to five games each year. CBS also partnered with Yahoo! Sports during the 2015 season, with Yahoo live streaming a CBS-produced game around the globe. The game was not available on CBS except in the local markets of the teams (Jacksonville and Buffalo). CBS again produced Yahoo! Sports's webcast of the Jaguars' 2017 game against the Baltimore Ravens.

On January 31, 2018, the NFL announced that Fox won the rights to televise Thursday Night Football for the next five seasons; this came after CBS requested a lower rights fee to compensate for declining viewership.

==== Tony Romo joins CBS ====
Following his retirement from the NFL, Tony Romo was hired by CBS Sports to serve as the lead color analyst for the network's NFL telecasts, working in the booth alongside play-by-play announcer Jim Nantz, replacing Phil Simms, who was moved to the studio for The NFL Today.

While there was no controversy regarding Romo deciding to retire and move on to broadcasting, some critics questioned Romo being immediately hired for the number one position ahead of broadcasting veterans Dan Fouts, Trent Green, or Rich Gannon, all of whom served in the number 2–4 positions respectively for CBS, with Fouts having once been the color commentator on Monday Night Football. While some critics had speculated that Romo was handed the top position so quickly because he wore a star on his helmet, other reports cited CBS having grown tired of Simms in the role, which was a mutual feeling shared by Simms himself. Nonetheless, none of the ex-players and coaches in a lead position on other networks at the time of Romo's hiring (Troy Aikman, Cris Collinsworth, and Jon Gruden) started their broadcasting career in the lead position. Simms jokingly asked Romo "How does that seat feel?" during Week 1 of The NFL Today.

Once the 2017 NFL season got underway, Romo received critical praise for his work as a recent ex-player, most notably for his ability to predict offensive plays and read defensive formations from the booth, and "adding an enthusiasm that had been lacking with Simms".

Romo and Nantz received further acclaim for their broadcasting of the 2018 AFC Championship Game between the Kansas City Chiefs and New England Patriots, as "Nantz continually set Romo up to make his predictions and analysis prior to the snap", and some suggested that Chiefs head coach "Andy Reid could have used Romo on his defensive staff, because the former quarterback knew just about every play the Patriots were going to run down the stretch". According to The Guardian, the "beauty of Romo's analysis is that it feels like he's in on the fun with you." Romo and Nantz called Super Bowl LIII in Atlanta.

CBS's coverage of Super Bowl LIII utilized a total of 115 cameras, including 8K resolution cameras (for the first time in a U.S. network sports telecast) in the end zones, as well as field-level and "up close" augmented reality graphics (with the latter generated from a wireless, handheld camera). Initial overnight Nielsen Ratings measured a 44.9 rating for the game, down 5% from the previous year and the lowest rating for a Super Bowl since Super Bowl XLIII ten years prior. 98.2 million viewers were measured, the fewest since Super Bowl XLII. Jemele Hill of The Atlantic attributed the low ratings "to the game being the lowest-scoring Super Bowl ever, moderate national interest in the Rams, the lingering bad taste from the huge blown call in the NFC Championship Game, and Patriots fatigue".

=== 2020s ===
CBS also gained rights to air a second Wild Card game, as the NFL expanded its postseason from 12 to 14 teams (7 in each conference). As part of gaining the rights to air the second game, which was played on January 10 at 4:40 ET, CBS's sister network Nickelodeon also aired a self-produced broadcast of the game, in an effort to promote a younger audience.

CBS will air two Wild Card games and one AFC Divisional game in odd-numbered years, two Wild Card games and both AFC Divisional games in even-numbered years, the AFC Championship Game (in the afternoon in even-numbered years, primetime in odd-numbered years), and the Super Bowl every three years.

Following Cam Newton's positive COVID-19 test, the New England Patriots-Kansas City Chiefs game, originally scheduled for Sunday afternoon, was postponed to Monday, October 5 at 7:05 p.m. ET to be broadcast nationally. This was CBS's first Monday night telecast since November 24, 2014. The Kansas City Chiefs won 26–10.

In October 2020, Amazon acquired rights to simulcast one of CBS's NFC Wild Card games on Amazon Prime Video, as part of its digital rights to the league (expanding upon its involvement with Thursday Night Football).

On October 13, 2020, due to multiple positive COVID-19 tests in the Tennessee Titans organization, the Titans-Buffalo Bills game was moved to Tuesday, which was the seventh Tuesday NFL game in history. The Titans ultimately won the game 42–16.

Super Bowl LV was televised by CBS. Although NBC was to air this game under the current rotation, they traded with CBS for Super Bowl LVI, which falls during the 2022 Winter Olympics and is the first to be scheduled during an ongoing Olympic Games (this also upholds the untold gentleman's agreement between the NFL's broadcasters to not counterprogram the Super Bowl, as NBC also holds the U.S. broadcast rights to the Olympics). CBS used 120 cameras in total, including 10 4K cameras, two 8K cameras, a crane camera, a Trolley Cam running parallel with the field, and two Sony Venice cameras that were used to produce cinematic and "3D-like" scenes reminiscent of video games. Production was decentralized due to COVID-19 protocols, with some production duties being conducted remotely from the CBS Broadcast Center in New York City and at individual employees' homes. CBS officially introduced a rebranding of the CBS Sports division during Super Bowl LV, as part of a larger brand unification process between the CBS network's main divisions.

On March 18, 2021, the NFL along with CBS, Fox, NBC, and ESPN announced an eleven-year extension of the league's rights deal with all four networks until the end of the 2033 season. The extended contract includes the continued rotation of the Super Bowl yearly among the four networks, meaning that CBS would air Super Bowl LVIII (2024), and will air Super Bowls LXII (2028) and LXVI (2032).

The broadcast teams for two games late in the 2021 season were impacted by COVID-19 protocols: Tom McCarthy filled in for Jim Nantz alongside Tony Romo for the Week 18 game between the Carolina Panthers and Tampa Bay Buccaneers, and Trent Green filled in for Charles Davis on color commentary alongside Ian Eagle for a divisional playoff game featuring the Cincinnati Bengals and Tennessee Titans.

On January 30, 2022, during the Verizon Halftime Report, all of the commentators were inaudible due to a technical fault involving an unannounced Walker Hayes halftime performance at Kansas City's Arrowhead Stadium. The speakers were unnoticeably placed in front of the CBS set.

The 2022 season marked Greg Gumbel's final season working NFL games on CBS, although he remained with the network as a studio host for NCAA March Madness coverage.

In August 2025 it was reported by media outlets and later confirmed by CEO Larry Ellison that following the merger of Skydance Media and Paramount Global that the NFL had acquired an undisclosed percentage stake in Paramount Skydance (CBS's parent company) following the merger due the league previously owning an equity stake in Skydance acquired in 2022 as part of a joint venture and partnership with Skydance Sports prior to the merger.

On October 2, 2026, CBS announced they had parted ways with Tony Romo following his operating while intoxicated (OWI) arrest on July 23. J. J. Watt, who had been hired by CBS the previous season as a game analyst, moved to the lead team to replace Romo.

==== Usage of Nickelodeon ====
CBS elected to capitalize on its re-merger with Viacom by incorporating its popular kids' channel Nickelodeon into NFL coverage. The idea for Nickelodeon to televise an NFL game was that of CBS Sports' chairman Sean McManus. During negotiations, McManus brought the idea up to the league, which was looking to reach younger and diverse audiences. While the network has aired sports-related programming in the past (such as its athletics game show Nickelodeon Guts, and its Kids' Choice Sports awards), this marked the first live sporting event to ever be televised by Nickelodeon.

McManus explained that the production planned to "respect the integrity of the game", but that there would be features "to make it look and feel very, very different than a CBS broadcast, which it should. I think it's really going to be fun." Coordinating producer Shawn Robbins described the broadcast as being a "Nick-ified", "co-viewing" experience for parents and children, and that it would still "look somewhat the same", as they did not want to "mess with your football and put stuff on if that's going to take away from the viewing experience."

Noah Eagle (son of CBS Sports commentator Ian Eagle, and radio play-by-play voice of the Los Angeles Clippers) served as play-by-play announcer, alongside former wide receiver and Good Morning Football and The NFL Today analyst Nate Burleson. They were also joined by two Nickelodeon actors, Gabrielle Nevaeh Green and Lex Lumpkin (who are both cast members of Nickelodeon's comedy series All That), as analyst and field reporter respectively. Emphasis was placed on educating viewers of the rules of football; this included appearances by Sheldon Cooper (as played by Iain Armitage on CBS sitcom Young Sheldon) to explain penalties. Robbins told The New York Times that Green was accidentally sent an 800-page package of game notes that was intended for Tony Romo.

The New Orleans Saints-Chicago Bears playoff game on January 10, 2021, as it was broadcast on CBS, was called by their lead commentary team of Jim Nantz (play-by-play) and Tony Romo (color). Due to COVID-19 protocols (which had also caused him to miss the previous week's game), Romo worked remotely. Nantz, as well as reporters Jay Feely and Tracy Wolfson, were present on-site in New Orleans.

In the lead-up to Super Bowl LV, Nickelodeon aired further programming previewing the game, while CBS added classic Nick elements such as green slime to segments of its Super Bowl broadcast.

Following the success of the 2021 Wild Card game, the NFL extended its partnership with Nickelodeon by allowing them rights to another Wild Card game in January 2022, the San Francisco 49ers against the Dallas Cowboys. Eagle, Burleson, and Green returned to call the game, plus a weekly highlights show hosted by Burleson with Tyler Perry's Young Dylan star Dylan Gilmer, who replaced Lumpkin as sideline reporter. Nickelodeon then televised a regular season Christmas Day game in 2022, between the Denver Broncos and the injury-plagued defending Super Bowl champion Los Angeles Rams.

For the 2023 season, Nickelodeon aired another Christmas Day game, the Las Vegas Raiders and the Kansas City Chiefs. In addition, Nickelodeon aired Super Bowl LVIII, marking the first time that the Super Bowl had an alternate telecast on another network.

== Market coverage and television policies ==
As with Fox's coverage, the network's stations are divided into different groups based on the most popular or closest team to that market or, if that does not apply, based on the allure of a particular game. Each football game is rated as an "A", "B" or "C" game, with "A" games likely being televised nationally and "C" games airing only in the home television markets of the two participating teams. Significantly more behind-the-scenes resources are dedicated to "A" game coverage.

Under NFL broadcasting rules, CBS must televise all of its assigned games in the home market of the visiting team (and, if it is sold out, the city where the game is being played) in its entirety. If a game is non-competitive, the network may switch all but the two home markets to another game. If a game is delayed or interrupted by severe weather, the network may switch to another game until the resumption of play. If the home team's game is blacked out, the local CBS affiliate is not allowed to replace it with another game. Prior to the 2014 season, if the blacked out game was part of a doubleheader nationally, the doubleheader would be cancelled in the blacked out markets.

From 1970 to 1993, CBS exclusively covered games involving only NFC opponents and interconference games in which the road team was a member of the NFC. From 1998 to 2013, CBS exclusively broadcast AFC-only games and interconference games featuring an AFC road team. Since the 2014 season, while AFC-only games still form the bulk of CBS's coverage, the league reserves the right to "cross-flex" games between CBS and Fox regardless of conference affiliation to maximize viewership – for example, high-profile NFC matchups that would be relegated to regional coverage because they occur during Fox's singleheader week can be moved to CBS' afternoon window.

=== Local preseason television coverage ===
Since CBS re-obtained the NFL broadcast rights in 1998, a number of the network's local stations have televised preseason football games, mostly including the network's graphics and production that viewers would normally see during regular season national/regional broadcasts.

A number of NFL teams and their broadcasting departments have teamed up with CBS Sports to produce games; as of 2011, these teams include the New York Jets (WCBS-TV in New York City), Los Angeles Chargers (KCBS-TV in Los Angeles) and Green Bay Packers (WGBA-TV in Green Bay and co-flagship WTMJ-TV in Milwaukee; since former CBS O&O WFRV-TV in Green Bay lost the local rights to the preseason games, Packers coverage on WGBA and WTMJ currently uses an in-house graphics package, although the telecasts continue to use a CBS technical and announcing team).

However, there are some that used a few, but not all, elements of the NFL on CBS production presentations, and they are mostly in-house productions between the teams and their individual flagship station; these include the Pittsburgh Steelers (KDKA-TV), Miami Dolphins (WFOR-TV), San Francisco 49ers (KPIX and KOVR in Sacramento), Dallas Cowboys (KTVT), Cincinnati Bengals (WKRC-TV), New England Patriots (WBZ-TV), and the Jacksonville Jaguars (WJAX-TV). CBS O&O WWJ-TV in Detroit was the Detroit Lions' flagship station from 2008 to 2010 and used most of their graphics and music. In addition to WWJ, of the stations mentioned, WCBS; KCBS; KDKA; WFOR; WUPA; KTVT; KPIX; KOVR; and WBZ are all currently owned by CBS Television Stations.

== On-air staff ==
=== Current ===
==== Play-by-play ====
- Andrew Catalon: play-by-play (2011–present)
- Spero Dedes: play-by-play (2010–present)
- Ian Eagle: play-by-play (1998–present)
- Kevin Harlan: play-by-play (1998–present)
- Chris Lewis: play-by-play (2023–present)
- Tom McCarthy: play-by-play (2014–present)
- Beth Mowins: play-by-play (2017–present)
- Jim Nantz: studio host/lead play-by-play (1998–present)

==== Studio hosts ====
- James Brown: studio host (2006–present)
- Nate Burleson: studio analyst (2017–present); fill-in studio host (2020–present); Nickelodeon analyst (2021–present)

==== Studio analysts ====
- Bill Cowher: studio analyst (2007–present)
- Nate Burleson: studio analyst/fill in studio host (2017–present)
- Russell Wilson: studio analyst (2026–present)
- Kyle Long: analyst/studio analyst (2025–present);

==== Game analysts ====
- Adam Archuleta: analyst (2014–present)
- Nate Burleson: Nickelodeon analyst (2021–present)
- Trent Green: analyst (2014–present)
- Logan Ryan: analyst (2025–present)
- Gene Steratore: rules analyst (2018–present)
- Ross Tucker: analyst (2023–present)
- Robert Turbin: analyst (2026-present)
- J. J. Watt: studio analyst/lead analyst (2023–present)

==== Sideline reporters ====
- Evan Washburn: sideline reporter (2014–present)
- Tracy Wolfson: lead sideline reporter (2013–present)
- Melanie Collins: sideline reporter (2017–present)
- Amanda Balionis: sideline reporter (2018–present)
- Tiffany Blackmon: sideline reporter (2023–present)
- AJ Ross: sideline reporter (2018–present)
- Dylan Gilmer: Nickelodeon reporter (2022–present)
- Aditi Kinkhabwala: sideline reporter (2022–present)
- Dylan Schefter: Nickelodeon sideline reporter (2022–present)

==== 2026 broadcaster pairings ====
1. Jim Nantz/J. J. Watt/Tracy Wolfson
2. Ian Eagle/Ross Tucker/Evan Washburn
3. Kevin Harlan/Trent Green/Melanie Collins
4. Andrew Catalon/Logan Ryan/AJ Ross
5. Spero Dedes/Adam Archuleta/Aditi Kinkhabwala
6. Tom McCarthy/Robert Turbin/Tiffany Blackmon
7. Chris Lewis/Luke Kuechly/Amanda Balionis (Week 3)

== Digital on-screen graphics ==
=== 1992–1993 ===
CBS Sports debuted on-screen graphics (as opposed to simple text) for its event telecasts in 1991. These graphics used a small score graphic that contained the score and game clock, which was removed during plays. The graphics were gray, beveled edged rectangles, with logos shown in a beveled edged square.

=== 1998–2000 ===
From 1998 to 2000, the scoring bug had a half-capsule shape where the score was displayed in white text on a blue background (that contained the CBS eye), below the quarter and time in black text on a white background. The down and distance would pop out from the bottom of the bug in a white box when necessary; it would spin around to show the number of timeouts left. The standard graphics were blue, and individual team graphics were colored according to the team. When a team scores, there were no special effects; it changes instantaneously.

=== 2001 ===
Starting in Super Bowl XXXV, the bug took on a more rectangular shape, with the score and quarter/time positions flipped. The scores were now displayed in white text against a gold background, and the quarter and time beneath them in a white text on a blue background. The down and distance and ball location popped out in two separate boxes underneath the main bug. New this season, the bug is situated on the left or right of the screen depending on which team has possession. The team-specific colors for graphics were dropped, and would not be used again by CBS until 2013.

Additionally, a gray transparent box score showing the live scores of the other out-of-town games is shown on the upper corner of the screen, opposite the score bug.

=== 2002–2005 ===
In 2002, a new bug with more of a horizontal orientation was introduced. The CBS Sports logo that previously adorned the top of the bug was replaced with the CBS "eye" logo in blue and white. The bug was divided into two rectangles, the left one housing the time and quarter and the right the teams and scores, all in white text on blue. As in years past, the down and distance were contained in a pop-out box, also in the blue and white scheme.

In 2002, the graphics package itself remained the same as in 2000 and 2001. However, the look was updated in 2003 to more closely match the design of the score box. Also in 2003, whenever there was a penalty, the metallic yellow "FLAG" display is flipped to show the description of the penalty (e.g. False Start, Offsides, Holding) and the team abbreviation below to indicate the offending team. In 2004 and 2005, the top two games each week were presented in high definition. These HD broadcasts used a score box optimized for the 16:9 frame, the first time that a U.S. network had used graphics optimized for high definition.

In Week 3 of the 2004 season, CBS unveiled a constant scoring update bar on the bottom of the screen (the first of its kind). This was initially called "Game Trax", and complimented "Stat Trax", unveiled the year before which was the first system to show player statistics updates popping out of the score display after a play (now standard on all networks).

=== 2006–2012 ===
The 2006 season introduced a new graphics package for The NFL on CBS, including a new logo (which also formed the base of SEC college football and NCAA college basketball logos) and new NFL Today studio set, as part of a network-wide overhaul of the graphics package. The digital on-screen graphics were also changed, with red and a light shade of blue introduced from the new logo. A more complex score bug included the new NFL on CBS logo and six circle segments stacked in columns of two emanating from the logo. The first two featured the quarter and time, the next two the team abbreviations (all in white text on the darker blue) and the last two each team's respective scores in black text on a white background. The entire bug was trimmed in the red and lighter blue; the down and distance pop-out changed to a half-ellipse shape.

When a team scores a touchdown, the columns that emanate from the logo collapse into the logo. The logo then quickly spins around to show the scoring team's logo, a full bar the shape of the combined boxes quickly protruding showing the word "TOUCHDOWN", with the bug sparkling. After about three or four seconds of this graphic showing, the aforementioned animation takes place once more, this time with the bug returning to normal. In all instances of points scored, the changed score flashes a few times to indicate a change in score, with a touchdown score changing after the "TOUCHDOWN" graphic is shown. Notably, this score box was not optimized for high definition as the previous package was, even on HD games.

In 2009, the score bug was changed to a top-screen banner, although the graphics package remained the same. This bug featured, horizontally left-to-right, the CBS "eye" logo, the down and distance against a white background, each team's logo, initials and points, and then the quarter and remaining time. When the down and distance was not displayed, that and the CBS "eye" logo were replaced by a blue and red "NFL on CBS" logo. When there was a penalty, the word "FLAG" replaced the down and distance on a yellow background, with the penalty description dropping down from below the team's initials; when there is an official review, the down and distance would be replaced by "OFFICIAL REVIEW" on a red background. For challenges, a drop-down below the teams initials with a dark red background shows with the word "CHALLENGE." The play clock would flash red when it hit the 5-second mark and stays red until the play clock is reset. When a team scored a touchdown, the entire bar would change, displaying the scoring team's logo on the left and the team's main color as the background, with the word "TOUCHDOWN" with the letter spacing widening for a few moments before returning to normal. After such, the team's score will be highlighted their color, and the previous score will be replaced by the new score (this also happens when the team's PAT or 2-point conversion is ruled to be good). After this occurs, stats of players involved immediately appear in the bottom of the banner.

A small white indicator showed on the top of the bar, on top of whatever team currently had possession of the ball. At times, at the bottom of the bar, various player statistics (such as quarterback ratings), game stats (such as drive summaries), and situational issues in the game (such as amount of timeouts remaining), would pop open for a few moments whenever it is needed. For Week 3 of the 2009 season, the possession indicator was changed to a small dot next to the team's logo due to the addition of timeout indicators across the top.

Beginning with the NCAA football season in September 2011, college football broadcasts on CBS and the CBS Sports Network began using a score bug mirroring this one. CBS Sports Network's United Football League coverage in 2012 also used the same graphics package.

=== 2013–2015 ===
CBS debuted a new graphics package starting with the network's coverage of Super Bowl XLVII; the package was used for all CBS game telecasts beginning with the 2013 season. Originally optimized for a 4:3 display, the elements are now optimized for the 16:9 format as a result of CBS's incorporation of the AFD #10 broadcast tag.

The lower third graphics adopt the column layout for player info graphics used by several other sports broadcasters. The portion containing the player's name is stacked on the left, with the team's primary color in the background of the name panel. Other statistics are shown on a gray background on panels to the right. The score banner is gray with team abbreviations listed over their primary color and next to their logo. For Sunday game broadcasts, the NFL on CBS logo is placed on the left; the "NFL" portion disappears and is replaced by the down and distance, "Flag", or "Official Review". Also for the Sunday broadcasts, challenges and statistics drop down from the bar. The only scoring play which used an animation is a touchdown, which involves the team logo and the word "Touchdown" appearing in place of the banner. Timeout indicators are located above the team abbreviations for Sunday broadcasts, and a possession indicator is located to the right of the abbreviation.

Since CBS began airing the evening games in 2014, Thursday Night Football games use a package with the usual CBS curved-edged graphics, however incorporating a generic "TNF" logo in lower thirds instead of the CBS logo because Thursday broadcasts also air on the NFL Network. A "TNF" text logo is also used in the border of full screen graphics where the "NFL on CBS" text is usually seen. The score bar is located on the bottom of the screen instead of the top, with the "NFL on CBS" text replaced by a "CBS TNF" mark, and the "TNF" portion disappearing to show down and distance. The usual play clock location is instead home to an NFL Network logo, with the play clock moved next to the game clock for Thursdays only. Any information that drops down from the bar on Sundays instead pops up from the bar on the Thursday broadcasts, with timeout indicators flipped to the bottom.

For the London NFL International Series game between the Buffalo Bills and Jacksonville Jaguars live-streamed on Yahoo in 2015, all silver "CBS" marks in the graphics package were replaced by purple "Yahoo" logos and the NFL logo. The game used the top-screen version of the scoring banner. The UK broadcast on Sky Sports featured no Yahoo or CBS logos, leaving only the NFL logo, while the BBC Two broadcast was a clean feed using the regular BBC Sport graphics package used for Rugby coverage.

=== 2016–2020 ===
During Super Bowl 50, CBS unveiled a major rebranding of the CBS Sports division, including a new logo and on-air graphics—moving its score bug to the bottom of the screen, and using outlined, rectangular graphics with a steel blue base and use of gradients. Beginning with Week 6 of the 2017 NFL season, the records for each team were displayed to the right of the timeout indicators. The records are not displayed during the playoffs and the first week of the regular season. Beginning with Super Bowl LIII and the subsequent 2019 season, the scoreboard received minor updates to elements such as its play clock (with its red background beginning to drain with five seconds remaining). A significantly different graphics scheme was used for Thursday Night Football games.

The Nickelodeon simulcasts on January 10, 2021, and January 16, 2022, featured various Nickelodeon-themed effects and features designed to appeal to the youth audience, with this template used as its basis. Various augmented reality graphics were employed, including the first down line being rendered in orange with animated green "slime" rather in yellow, as well as the end zone pylons becoming virtual "slime cannons" on touchdowns (dubbed the "Slime Zone") (both in keeping with Nickelodeon's long tradition of green slime), the net behind the uprights on field goal attempts being rendered as the face of SpongeBob SquarePants and Patrick Star, and replays edited to include "Snapchat-like" filters such as hats, googly eyes, and Nickelodeon characters. During the halftime show, 3D animated recreations of highlights with Minecraft-like "Blockie" players were featured, generated using data from the NFL Next Gen Stats system.

During Week 13 of the 2020 season, the game between the Green Bay Packers and Philadelphia Eagles was used as a rehearsal to test the effects and workflows for the Nickelodeon broadcast. Eight dedicated cameras were used to augment those being shared with the main CBS production, in order to provide camera angles optimized for the augmented reality effects (such as a wider end zone view for the "slime cannon").

=== 2021–present ===
CBS Sports unveiled a new graphics package during Super Bowl LV, as part of a wider rebranding of the CBS Sports division in support of the network's new corporate identity. The insert graphics maintain a similar overall structure to the designs used since 2016, except being flat and black with no borders, and incorporating elements of the "deconstructed eye" motif and CBS corporate font.

During the 2021 season, CBS introduced a new feature known as "RomoVision" in collaboration with Genius Sports, which displays a top-down overlay of the field with players represented by X and O symbols during selected replays to assist in visualizing plays. In 2022, the feature received a George Wensel Technical Achievement Award at the Sports Emmy Awards.

During Super Bowl LVIII, CBS debuted an updated score bar for the 2024 season, returning to a gradient-shaded appearance with revised typography, although the remainder of the graphics continued to follow the designs used since 2021.

In the 2025 season, CBS introduced a new scoreboard, replacing the bar design used since 2016 with a centered, "pod" layout reminiscent of Fox (with the two teams displayed in opposing directions, and the game clock and down/distance display in the center). In addition, CBS replaced its in-game ticker for scores from other games with a small translucent box in the top-left corner of the screen. A CBS Sports designer stated that the change was inspired by its persistent leaderboard graphic for PGA Tour coverage. Once again, the remainder of the graphics continue to follow the designs used since 2021.

== Music ==
The theme song for NFL on CBS is "Posthumus Zone" by E.S. Posthumus. The theme song made its debut on the broadcast during the 2003 NFL season.

== Nielsen ratings ==
The Sunday afternoon, October 14, 2007, game between the New England Patriots and Dallas Cowboys on CBS, was viewed by 29.1 million people, making it the most-watched NFL Sunday game since the Dallas Cowboys–San Francisco 49ers game on November 10, 1996 on Fox (29.7 million viewers), according to Nielsen Media Research data. The game was also the most-watched television program for the week of October 8–14, drawing nine million viewers more than the CBS crime drama CSI: Crime Scene Investigation (19.8 million viewers), and was the most-watched program of the season.

The November 4, 2007, broadcast of a game between the New England Patriots and Indianapolis Colts drew a 20.1 rating and 33.8 million viewers for CBS.

During the 17-week 2008 season (September 4 – December 28, 2008), CBS' regular-season game telecasts were watched by an estimated cumulative audience of 150.9 million viewers, 14% higher than NBC's 132.4 million viewers, 3% higher than Fox's 146.9 million viewers, and 52% higher than ESPN's 99.4 million. The cumulative audience is based on the total number of viewers (persons 2+) who watched at least six minutes of NFL game coverage since the start of the 2008 regular season.

For the 2009 season, the network's regular-season telecasts averaged 19.509 million viewers (counting only seven airings during the season by Nielsen). For the first thirteen weeks of the 2013 season, the CBS game telecasts averaged 26.5 million viewers.

The February 11, 2024 broadcast of Super Bowl LVIII on CBS and Nickelodeon became the most watched telecast in U.S. television history, averaging a combined 123.7 million viewers. The record was since shattered by next year's Super Bowl LIX televised on Fox and streamed on Tubi, averaging an approximate 127.7 million viewers.

The 2025 Thanksgiving Day matchup between the Kansas City Chiefs and the Dallas Cowboys became the most watched regular-season NFL game ever, averaging 57.2 million viewers.

== See also ==
- The NFL Today
- NFL on Fox
- NBC Sunday Night Football
- ESPN Monday Night Football
- Thursday Night Football
- College Football on CBS Sports

Records
Preceded by NBC and DuMont	National Football League broadcaster (with NBC from 1956 to 1963); 1956–1969	Succeeded by AFL–NFL merger
Preceded by AFL–NFL merger	National Football Conference broadcaster 1970–1993	Succeeded by Fox
Preceded by NBC	American Football Conference broadcaster 1998–present	Succeeded by Incumbent
Preceded by NFL Network	NFL Thursday Night Football broadcaster (with NFL Network); 2014–2017, shared with NBC (2016–2017)	Succeeded by Fox
