= List of NFL Today personalities =

Season	Studio Host	Studio Analysts
1975	Brent Musburger	Irv Cross; Phyllis George
1976	Brent Musburger	Irv Cross; Phyllis George; Jimmy Snyder
1977	Brent Musburger	Irv Cross; Phyllis George; Jimmy Snyder
1978	Brent Musburger	Irv Cross; Jimmy Snyder; Jayne Kennedy
1979	Brent Musburger	Irv Cross; Jimmy Snyder; Jayne Kennedy
1980	Brent Musburger	Irv Cross; Jimmy Snyder; Phyllis George
1981	Brent Musburger	Irv Cross; Jimmy Snyder; Phyllis George
1982	Brent Musburger	Irv Cross; Jimmy Snyder; Phyllis George
1983	Brent Musburger	Irv Cross; Jimmy Snyder; Phyllis George; Charlsie Cantey
1984	Brent Musburger	Irv Cross; Jimmy Snyder
1985	Brent Musburger	Irv Cross; Jimmy Snyder
1986	Brent Musburger	Irv Cross; Jimmy Snyder; Will McDonough
1987	Brent Musburger	Irv Cross; Jimmy Snyder; Will McDonough
1988	Brent Musburger	Irv Cross; Dick Butkus; Will McDonough
1989	Brent Musburger	Irv Cross; Dick Butkus; Will McDonough
1990	Greg Gumbel	Terry Bradshaw; Lesley Visser; Pat O'Brien; Jim Gray
1991	Greg Gumbel	Terry Bradshaw; Lesley Visser; Pat O'Brien; Jim Gray
1992	Greg Gumbel	Terry Bradshaw; Lesley Visser; Pat O'Brien; Jim Gray
1993	Greg Gumbel	Terry Bradshaw; Lesley Visser; Pat O'Brien; Jim Gray
1994	No program	
1995	No program	
1996	No program	
1997	No program	
1998	Jim Nantz	Marcus Allen; Brent Jones; George Seifert; Michael Lombardi; Bonnie Bernstein
1999	Jim Nantz	Craig James; Randy Cross; Jerry Glanville
2000	Jim Nantz	Craig James; Randy Cross; Jerry Glanville; Mike Ditka
2001	Jim Nantz	Deion Sanders; Randy Cross; Jerry Glanville; Mike Ditka
2002	Jim Nantz	Deion Sanders; Dan Marino; Boomer Esiason
2003	Jim Nantz	Deion Sanders; Dan Marino; Boomer Esiason
2004	Greg Gumbel	Dan Marino; Boomer Esiason; Shannon Sharpe
2005	Greg Gumbel	Dan Marino; Boomer Esiason; Shannon Sharpe
2006	James Brown	Dan Marino; Boomer Esiason; Shannon Sharpe; Charley Casserly
2007	James Brown	Dan Marino; Boomer Esiason; Shannon Sharpe; Bill Cowher; Charley Casserly
2008	James Brown	Dan Marino; Boomer Esiason; Shannon Sharpe; Bill Cowher; Charley Casserly
2009	James Brown	Dan Marino; Boomer Esiason; Shannon Sharpe; Bill Cowher; Charley Casserly
2010	James Brown	Dan Marino; Boomer Esiason; Shannon Sharpe; Bill Cowher; Charley Casserly
2011	James Brown	Dan Marino; Boomer Esiason; Shannon Sharpe; Bill Cowher; Charley Casserly
2012	James Brown	Dan Marino; Boomer Esiason; Shannon Sharpe; Bill Cowher; Jason La Canfora
2013	James Brown	Dan Marino; Boomer Esiason; Shannon Sharpe; Bill Cowher; Jason La Canfora
2014	James Brown	Tony Gonzalez; Bill Cowher; Bart Scott; Boomer Esiason; Jason La Canfora
2015	James Brown	Tony Gonzalez; Bill Cowher; Bart Scott; Boomer Esiason; Jason La Canfora
2016	James Brown	Tony Gonzalez; Bill Cowher; Bart Scott; Boomer Esiason; Jason La Canfora
2017	James Brown	Phil Simms; Bill Cowher; Nate Burleson; Boomer Esiason; Jason La Canfora
2018	James Brown	Phil Simms; Bill Cowher; Nate Burleson; Boomer Esiason; Jason La Canfora
2019	James Brown	Phil Simms; Bill Cowher; Nate Burleson; Boomer Esiason; Jason La Canfora
2020	James Brown	Phil Simms; Bill Cowher; Nate Burleson; Boomer Esiason; Jason La Canfora
2021	James Brown	Phil Simms; Bill Cowher; Nate Burleson; Boomer Esiason; Jason La Canfora
2022	James Brown	Phil Simms; Bill Cowher; Nate Burleson; Boomer Esiason; Jonathan Jones
2023	James Brown	Phil Simms; Bill Cowher; Nate Burleson; Boomer Esiason; J. J. Watt; Jonathan Jones
2024	James Brown	Bill Cowher; Nate Burleson; Matt Ryan; J. J. Watt; Jonathan Jones
2025	James Brown	Bill Cowher; Nate Burleson; Matt Ryan; Jonathan Jones
2026	James Brown	Bill Cowher; Nate Burleson; Russell Wilson; Kyle Long
