= Jimmy Snyder (sports commentator) =

American horse racing announcer & television sports announcer (1918–1996)

- Born: Dimetrios Georgios Synodinos; September 9, 1918; Steubenville, Ohio, U.S.
- Died: April 21, 1996 (aged 77); Las Vegas, Nevada, U.S.
- Resting place: Union Cemetery; Steubenville, Ohio
- Other names: James George Snyder, Sr. Jimmy "the Greek" Snyder

James George Snyder Sr. (born Dimetrios Georgios Synodinos, September 9, 1918 – April 21, 1996), better known as Jimmy the Greek, was an American sports commentator and Las Vegas bookmaker. A regular contributor to the CBS program The NFL Today, Snyder predicted the scores of NFL games, which sports bettors used to determine the point spread. In January 1988, Snyder was fired by CBS after he made comments suggesting that breeding practices during slavery had led Black Americans to become superior athletes.

== Early life and career ==
Snyder was born in Steubenville, Ohio. According to his New York Times obituary of April 22, 1996, Snyder's family roots were in the village of Tholopotami (Θολoποτάμι), on the island of Chios in the Aegean Sea. As a teenager in Ohio, he became acquainted with bookmakers. When he was ten years old, he lost his mother when his uncle, driven mad by the loss of his wife, shot and killed Snyder's mother and aunt, who were walking home, before killing himself. Snyder told his mother that he wanted to stay at the grocery store that his father was running and play rather than walk home with his mother, which he cited as likely saving his life but also as a reason he became a gambler.

According to his autobiography Jimmy the Greek, Snyder bet $10,000 on the 1948 election between Thomas Dewey and Harry S. Truman, getting 17–1 odds for Truman to win. In a later interview he indicated that he knew Truman was going to win because Dewey had a mustache and "American women didn't trust men with a mustache".

He invested money in oil drilling and coal mining, but those ventures failed. He lived in Las Vegas after moving there in the 1950s. He worked as an oddsmaker and gambler, at places such as the Vegas Turf and Sportsroom. In 1962, he was convicted of interstate transportation of bets and wagering information alongside conspiracy and violating the Federal Communications Act (having been caught giving a betting tip over the telephone). He was fined $50,000 and labeled a convicted felon. He worked in public relations for a time, including a couple of years working for Howard Hughes. In the mid-1960s, he began a news column involving a sports betting line for the Las Vegas Sun, which eventually received widespread publication.

In 1974, he received a presidential pardon from Gerald Ford.

== The NFL Today ==
The sports line eventually led to a 12-year stint on the CBS Sunday morning show, The NFL Today, a pregame show for National Football League (NFL) games, starting in 1976. Known simply as "Jimmy the Greek," he would appear in segments with sportscaster Brent Musburger and predict the results of that week's NFL games. While already famous in gambling circles, his rough charm made him into a minor celebrity. He would have conflicts with both Musburger and Phyllis George, with a 1980 fight happening between Musburger and Snyder while George was brought to tears by a comment made by Snyder over her husband, then-Kentucky Governor John Brown. While Musburger would make light of the fight (covered by the press), George would request to have Snyder tape his segment with Musburger in advance so that Snyder and George were not on the set at the same time.

As sports betting was illegal in most of the United States, and was at the time a general social taboo, his segment would not overtly mention betting or gambling. Instead, Snyder would predict the score of each game; for example, he would say the Los Angeles Raiders would beat the Los Angeles Rams by a score of 31–21 (ten points). This allowed bettors who knew the line of the game to be able to deduce his selection when betting the point spread: If the spread in the example game was the Raiders by five, bettors would know Snyder was picking the Raiders to beat it. The NFL was adamant about avoiding any official connections between gambling and the league, but NFL Commissioner Pete Rozelle was an acquaintance of Snyder and made it clear that his work on CBS was acceptable.

=== Racial comments and dismissal ===
On January 16, 1988, Snyder was fired by the CBS network (where he had been a regular on NFL Today since 1976) after making several questionable comments about African Americans during a lunchtime interview on January 15, 1988, with Ed Hotaling, a producer-reporter for NBC-owned WRC-TV, at Duke Zeibert's Washington, D.C., restaurant. Hotaling said that he had been doing interviews with various people in the restaurant for a program celebrating the birthday of Martin Luther King Jr. and what they thought the next step in civil rights progress for African Americans should be. He put the question to Snyder. "It was all on the occasion of Martin Luther King's birthday," Hotaling said. "So I thought it was an appropriate, forward-looking question, and got a backward-looking answer." Hotaling did not approve of the firing in an interview, stating, "It's outrageous he [Snyder] should be fired for exercising his First Amendment rights. Rather than silence him, they should keep him on and cover the issue of civil rights in sports."

One of Snyder's more controversial responses to the question was that African Americans were naturally superior athletes at least in part because they had been bred to produce stronger offspring during slavery:

The black is a better athlete to begin with, because he's been bred to be that way. Because of his high thighs and big thighs that goes up into his back. And they can jump higher and run faster because of their bigger thighs. And he's bred to be the better athlete because this goes back all the way to the Civil War, when, during the slave trading, the big, the owner, the slave owner would breed his big black to his big woman so that he could have uh big black kid, see. That's where it all started!

According to the New York Times obituary, Snyder expressed regret for his comments: "What a foolish thing to say." His CBS coworkers publicly stated that they did not agree with Snyder's theories and that they did not oppose CBS's decision to fire him. Black former NFL player Irv Cross said in the 30 for 30 documentary about Snyder that he had worked alongside Snyder for a long time and did not consider him to be a racist at all. In the same documentary, Frank Deford sympathetically noted that Jimmy often tried to sound more educated than he actually was and that his comments were basically him trying to make a point about a subject on which he knew nothing.

In the same WRC-TV interview, Snyder, whose remarks were termed "reprehensible" by CBS, also commented that the only sports realm in which white people then dominated was coaching and that if Black people were to "take coaching, as I think everyone wants them to, there is not going to be anything left for the white people." Snyder, during his remarks, emphasized he was not meaning to be "derogatory" but said the only thing then that "whites control are the coaching jobs—the Black talent is beautiful, it's great, it's out there. The only thing left for the whites is a couple of coaching jobs."

In 1991, Snyder sued the CBS network for age discrimination, defamation, and breach of contract. Snyder maintained that his firing aggravated his personal health problems, according to court papers. Snyder's attorney, Jeffery L. Liddle, stated that by "firing and repudiating Mr. Snyder, CBS quashed his dream, his dignity, and his spirit." Snyder lost the case. Snyder's life went downhill after his firing, between financial and health problems and his increasingly reclusive existence in Las Vegas.

== In popular culture ==
Snyder appeared in a cameo in the 1981 comedy film The Cannonball Run as a bookie. In the movie, he offered 50–1 odds against Formula One driver Jamie Blake (played by Dean Martin) and gambler Morris Fenderbaum (played by Sammy Davis Jr.) winning the Cannonball coast-to-coast endurance race. Snyder and Dean Martin were childhood acquaintances in Steubenville, Ohio.

On November 10, 2009, ESPN aired a show in their 30 for 30 series titled The Legend of Jimmy the Greek, which was produced by Fritz Mitchell. Commentary was provided by, among others, Brent Musburger, Irv Cross and Phyllis George from The NFL Today, plus Anthony Snyder (Jimmy's son), as well as his brother Johnny and sister Angie. The show also acknowledges his role in the first sportscasts of poker tournaments.

Although Snyder was largely unknown outside of the United States, in 1974, his name achieved international renown. After beating George Foreman to regain the world heavyweight championship, Muhammad Ali, in the midst of an interview with David Frost, looked into the camera and addressed his doubters. "All of you bow" he said. "All of my critics crawl... All of you suckers bow... If you wanna know any damn thing about boxing, don't go to no boxing experts in Las Vegas, don't go to no Jimmy the Greek. Come to Muhammad Ali."

He was parodied in sketches on Saturday Night Live and Second City Television, portrayed on the respective programs by Phil Hartman and John Candy. His comments about black athletes also inspired an appearance by Hans and Franz.

Snyder is also parodied in an episode of The Simpsons titled "Lisa the Greek", which was named after him. A character modeled after him named "Smooth" Jimmy Apollo (played by Phil Hartman) is featured in the episode giving dubious predictions about football games.

Snyder was referenced in an episode of The Golden Girls titled "And Ma Makes Three." Rose asks Dorothy if she is really going to dump her mother in order to spend alone time with her boyfriend, Dorothy responds with "Faster than CBS dumped Jimmy the Greek."

Snyder was again referenced in an episode of Norm Macdonald Live where Norm Macdonald quipped to guest star Kevin Nealon, "They fired Jimmy the Greek for being a racist. Meanwhile they call him 'the Greek.'"

== Personal life ==
Snyder and his wife Joan lost three of their five children to cystic fibrosis.

Snyder suffered from diabetes in his later years and died of a heart attack on April 21, 1996, in Las Vegas, Nevada at the age of 77. He is buried at Union Cemetery in his native Steubenville.
