= Duke Zeibert =

American restaurateur

David George "Duke" Zeibert (1910 – August 15, 1997) was an American restaurateur who, for 44 years, was the proprietor of a restaurant in Washington, D.C., Duke Zeibert's, that was frequented by Presidents, senators, lawyers, lobbyists, quarterbacks, coaches, and columnists. Every President from Harry S. Truman to Gerald Ford ate at his restaurant; Jimmy Carter sent his son Jeff with an autographed picture to the location.

Zeibert was born in 1910 in Troy, New York, and as a young man drifted into the restaurant business, working his way up from busing to waiter and eventually landing in Washington on K Street for many years and later at Connecticut Avenue and L Street, a prime downtown location in Washington, just four blocks from the White House. He was given the nickname Duke because he was always a fancy dresser. Even in his eighties, he wore his blazing white hair shoulder-length. People started calling him Duke in Miami in the 1940s, when he showed up for work as a waiter in white silk pants. He looked like Paul Whiteman, the band leader.

In 1980, after 30 years at Connecticut and L, Mr. Zeibert was forced to close his restaurant for several years while the building housing it was torn down and rebuilt. By the time he reopened, he and his longtime manager, Mel Krupin, were no longer friends, for Mr. Krupin had decided to open his own version of Duke's down the street, called Mel Krupin's and complete with pickles and onion rolls. As Mr. Krupin told it, he had been led to believe that Mr. Zeibert would never reopen.

The Restaurant Association Metropolitan Washington (RAMW) has named an annual award after Duke Zeibert, who was its first recipient in 1994. The Duke Zeibert Capital Achievement Award is presented at the Annual Restaurant Awards Gala, THE RAMMYS to a member of the community whose dedication and leadership have contributed to the success of Washington's vibrant restaurant industry.
