= Irv Cross =

American football player and sportscaster (1939–2021)

- Cross interviewing Pete Rozelle in 1980

No. 27
- Position: Cornerback

Personal information
- Born: July 27, 1939; Hammond, Indiana, U.S.
- Died: February 28, 2021 (aged 81); North Oaks, Minnesota, U.S.
- Listed height: 6 ft 2 in (1.88 m)
- Listed weight: 195 lb (88 kg)

Career information
- High school: Hammond
- College: Northwestern
- NFL draft: 1961: 7th round, 98th overall pick
- AFL draft: 1961: 15th round, 118th overall pick

Career history

Playing
- Philadelphia Eagles (1961–1965); Los Angeles Rams (1966–1968); Philadelphia Eagles (1969)

Coaching
- Philadelphia Eagles (1969) Assistant coach; Philadelphia Eagles (1970) Defensive backs coach

Awards and highlights
- 2× Pro Bowl (1964, 1965)

Career NFL statistics
- Interceptions: 22
- Interception yards: 258
- Defensive touchdowns: 2
- Fumble recoveries: 14
- Stats at Pro Football Reference

Irvin Acie Cross (July 27, 1939 – February 28, 2021) was an American professional football player and sportscaster. He played cornerback in the National Football League (NFL) and was a two-time Pro Bowl selection with the Philadelphia Eagles. Working with CBS, Cross was the first African-American sports analyst on national television. He was an initial co-host of The NFL Today, which became the pre-game show standard for all television networks.

After playing college football for the Northwestern Wildcats, Cross was selected by Philadelphia in the seventh round of the 1961 NFL draft. He played six of his nine NFL seasons with the Eagles. He was traded to the Los Angeles Rams and played there for three seasons before returning to the Eagles and finishing his playing career. While he was playing, Cross was also a radio and TV sports reporter in Philadelphia. He joined CBS in 1971, where he worked until 1994. The Pro Football Hall of Fame awarded him the Pete Rozelle Radio-Television Award in 2009, becoming the first black person to receive the award. He was also an athletic director at Idaho State University and Macalester College.

== Early life ==
Cross was born in Hammond, Indiana, as the fourth of 13 or eighth of 15 children. His mother died in childbirth in 1951, when Cross was in 7th grade. His father was a heavy drinker and had beaten Cross's mother during his childhood; these memories remained raw for Cross throughout his life. After her death, Cross took on responsibilities in caring for his younger siblings, and would frequently miss school to look out for them. He also served in his community as a Sunday school teacher, lifeguard and summer camp counselor by the time he was 17. Cross also spent parts of his summers working for a local attorney.

He attended Hammond High School, where he played football, basketball and was also a member of the track team as a broad jumper and low hurdler. As a senior, he was a two-way player on the school's football team, leading Hammond to its first division title in 19 years. He scored nine touchdowns as a running back, and was considered an even better defensive player. He shared the football team's most valuable player honors in 1957.

The Hammond Times (later known as The Times) named him the 1957 Prep Athlete of the Year, among multi-sport male athletes from 14 schools in the Hammond region.

== College career ==
Cross received a scholarship to attend Northwestern University. He graduated with a Bachelor of Science degree from Northwestern's School of Education and Social Policy in 1961, the same graduating class as future broadcasting colleague Brent Musburger. He was part of Ara Parseghian's first recruiting class with the Wildcats. A three-year football letterman from 1958 through 1960, Cross played wide receiver, defensive back, and defensive end for Northwestern. He was a team captain and an honorable mention All-Conference selection in the Big Ten in 1960. He also starred in track and was honored as the university's Male Athlete of the Year as a senior.

== Professional football career ==
=== Philadelphia Eagles ===
Cross was selected by the Philadelphia Eagles in the seventh round (98th overall) of the 1961 NFL draft. He was one of the first African-American starters for the franchise. After beginning his rookie year in 1961 as third string, he became the Eagles starting right cornerback eight games into the season after a broken leg ended Tom Brookshier's career. He played in 13 games, starting seven, with two interceptions. The Eagles had a 10–4 record that season, but had losing seasons over the next four years of Cross's Philadelphia career, as a starting cornerback.

Cross suffered numerous concussions that year, prompting his teammates to call him "Paper Head". The most severe was in Pittsburgh, when he was unconscious after blocking on a punt return for Timmy Brown. He spent three nights in a hospital. The team doctor said that a major hit to the head could be fatal if he returned too soon. To protect himself, Cross had a helmet with extra padding made. "I just tried to keep my head out of the way while making tackles, but that's just the way it was. Most of the time, they gave you some smelling salts and you went back in. We didn't know", he recalled in 2018.

In his second season in 1962, Cross had a career-high five interceptions. He had two interceptions in 1963 and three in 1964, including an interception against the Pittsburgh Steelers that he returned 94 yards for a touchdown. He also had a fumble recovery and 1½ quarterback sacks in 1964. He had three more interceptions in 1965, and returned 14 punts and 25 kickoffs that season, with his 26.5 yards per kickoff return the fifth best average in the NFL. Cross had consecutive Pro Bowl seasons in 1964 and 1965, before he was traded to the Los Angeles Rams for Aaron Martin and Willie Brown in 1966.

=== Los Angeles Rams ===
Cross played in every game for the Rams from 1966 to 1968, starting 40 games at right cornerback over that time. In 1966, he had one interception, which he returned 60 yards for a touchdown against the New York Giants. He also returned 12 punts and 12 kickoffs for the Rams that year, with his longest a 67-yard kickoff return against the Vikings in an October 1966 game. The 1967 Rams had an 11–1–2 record, winning the NFL's Coastal Division, with the Rams' defense giving up the fewest points of any NFL team that year during the regular season. Cross had two interceptions, and returned 17 punts and four kickoffs for the 1967 Rams. The Rams stopped using Cross as a returner in 1968, and he had three interceptions in 14 starts.

=== Return to Eagles ===
In 1969, Philadelphia Eagles All-Pro offensive tackle Bob Brown demanded a trade. The Rams traded Cross, offensive tackle Joe Carollo, and guard Don Chuy for Brown and cornerback Jim Nettles. Cross returned to the Eagles and became a player/coach. Cross retired from play before the 1970 season, becoming a coach for the Eagles.

He finished his playing career with 22 interceptions, 14 fumble recoveries, eight forced fumbles, and two defensive touchdowns.

== Broadcasting career ==
During his playing career, Cross did drive-time sports reports on WIBG (now WNTP) before doing weekend sports on KYW-TV. He was the first black person to do TV sports reports in Philadelphia.

Cross became an analyst and commentator for CBS Sports in 1971, when he became the first African American to work as a sports analyst on national television. In 1975, he teamed with Musburger and Phyllis George on The NFL Today and became the first African American to co-anchor a network sports program. The show was the pregame model all networks used thereafter. Previously, pregame shows were less prestigious than their postgame counterparts, which featured all the Sunday highlights. Cross co-hosted The NFL Today from its inception through 1989. In 1990, the network revamped the show after firing Musburger in a contract dispute, ending Cross's run on the show. He returned to being a game analyst. Overall, Cross worked at CBS Sports for 23 years as a studio host and game analyst.

In addition to his work on CBS's NFL coverage, Cross called NBA basketball, track and field, and gymnastics at various times for the network. He worked as an analyst through the conclusion of the 1991 season. He did not return to network television. "I didn't have an agent, and I didn't search for a TV position as aggressively as I should have", he said in 1996.

Cross was the 2009 recipient of the Pete Rozelle Radio-Television Award – the award, given annually by the Pro Football Hall of Fame, recognizes "long-time exceptional contributions to radio and television in professional football." He was the first black person to receive the award.

== Honors ==
Cross was inducted into the Indiana Football Hall of Fame in 1996. In 1987, Cross was inducted into the Hammond Sports Hall of Fame.

== Personal life and death ==
Cross served as athletic director at Idaho State University from 1996 to 1998. He then was the director of athletics at Macalester College in Saint Paul, Minnesota, for six years until June 2005. He was the CEO of Big Brothers Big Sisters of Central Minnesota until May 2010, and returned to football commentary for the Twin Cities' Fox station KMSP-TV.

Cross had two daughters from a first marriage and two children with his second wife Elizabeth. He was diagnosed with a mild form of dementia in 2018. He suspected that the condition, along with his headaches, neck pain, and backaches, was a result of chronic traumatic encephalopathy (CTE) caused by hits to the head that he had suffered during his playing career. Cross arranged to have his brain donated to the Boston University CTE Center after his death, and it was later confirmed that he had the most severe level of CTE, stage 4. He is one of at least 345 NFL players to be diagnosed after death with this disease.

Cross died on February 28, 2021, aged 81, at a hospice in North Oaks, Minnesota, near his home in Roseville. His cause of death was heart disease (ischemic cardiomyopathy).

== Publications ==
- Cross, Irv; Brown, Clifton (2017). Bearing the Cross: My Inspiring Journey from Poverty to the NFL and Sports Television. Sports Publishing. ISBN 9781683581178.
