= ABC college bowl game broadcasts =

American college football on American television network

ABC has been airing college football since acquiring the NCAA contract in 1966. Chris Schenkel and Bud Wilkinson were the number one broadcast team through 1973. Keith Jackson, its best-known college football play-by-play man, announced games from 1966 through 2005 on ABC (and for 14 years before that for various outlets), and was considered by many to be "the voice of college football." Jackson was ABC's lead play-by play man for 25 years, from 1974 through 1998. He originally was to retire after the 1999 Fiesta Bowl, but agreed to remain on a more restricted schedule (primarily broadcasting West Coast games) and remained with ABC through the 2006 Rose Bowl.

== Major bowl games ==
From 1999 to 2006 (1998-2005 seasons), all games of the Bowl Championship Series were televised by ABC Sports. Generally, coverage consisted of two games on New Year's Day, one on January 2, and one on either January 3 or 4. ABC paid nearly $25 million per year for the broadcast rights to the Fiesta, Sugar and Orange bowls during that time. Overall, the contract was worth $550 million over the eight years for all the bowl games.

Starting with the 2006 season, coverage would be split between ABC and Fox. Fox paid for each bowl game US$20 million. Four of the BCS bowl games were on FOX: the Orange Bowl, Sugar Bowl, Fiesta Bowl, and a new fifth game, the BCS National Championship Game. ABC will continue to broadcast the Rose Bowl Game. ABC had a $300 million eight-year contract that extends to 2014 for the broadcast rights for the Rose Bowl.

In 2007, ABC and Fox showed one game each on January 1, Fox then showed one game each on January 2 and 3 and came back with the championship game on January 8. A similar schedule is planned for future years.

Fox showed all BCS championship games the first three years of the contract, while in 2010 the Rose Bowl stadium was the location of the BCS Championship game, and ABC televised it.

=== Fiesta Bowl ===
From 1999 to 2006, the game aired on ABC as part of the first BCS package.

Date	Network	Play-by-play	Color commentator(s)	Sideline reporter(s)
January 2, 2006	ABC	Brent Musburger	Gary Danielson	Jack Arute
January 1, 2005	ABC	Brent Musburger	Gary Danielson	Lynn Swann
January 2, 2004	ABC	Tim Brant	Ed Cunningham	Sam Ryan
January 3, 2003	ABC	Keith Jackson	Dan Fouts	Todd Harris and Lynn Swann
January 1, 2002	ABC	Brent Musburger	Gary Danielson	Jack Arute
January 1, 2001	ABC	Sean McDonough	Ed Cunningham	Leslie Gudel
January 2, 2000	ABC	Tim Brant	Dean Blevins	Leslie Gudel
January 4, 1999	ABC	Keith Jackson	Bob Griese	Lynn Swann

=== Orange Bowl ===
ABC held the rights to the event from 1962 to 1964 and again from 1999 to 2006.

Date	Network	Play-by-play	Color commentator	Sideline reporters
January 3, 2006	ABC	Mike Tirico	Kirk Herbstreit	Erin Andrews
January 4, 2005	ABC	Brad Nessler	Bob Griese	Lynn Swann and Todd Harris
January 1, 2004	ABC	Brad Nessler	Bob Griese	Lynn Swann
January 2, 2003	ABC	Tim Brant	Ed Cunningham	Sam Ryan
January 2, 2002	ABC	Brad Nessler	Bob Griese	Lynn Swann
January 3, 2001	ABC	Brad Nessler	Bob Griese	Lynn Swann and Jack Arute
January 1, 2000	ABC	Brad Nessler	Bob Griese	Lynn Swann
January 2, 1999	ABC	Brad Nessler	Gary Danielson	Dean Blevins
January 1, 1964	ABC	Curt Gowdy	Paul Christman	
January 1, 1963	ABC	Curt Gowdy	Paul Christman	Jim McKay
January 1, 1962	ABC	Curt Gowdy	Paul Christman	Paul Christman

=== Peach Bowl ===
Date	Network	Play-by-play announcers	Color commentators	Sideline reporters
December 29, 1990	ABC	Steve Zabriskie	Lynn Swann	Susan Hunt
December 30, 1989	ABC	Gary Bender	Dick Vermeil	

=== Rose Bowl ===
From 1989 to 2010, the game was broadcast on ABC, usually at 2 p.m. PST; the 2005 edition was the first one broadcast in HDTV. Beginning in 2007, FOX had the broadcast rights to the other Bowl Championship Series games, but the Rose Bowl, which negotiates its own television contract independent of the BCS, had agreed to keep the game on ABC.

Beginning with the 2010 season, ESPN (majority-owned by ABC's parent company, The Walt Disney Company) now broadcasts all the BCS/CFP games, including the Rose Bowl game.

Date	Network	Play-by-play	Color commentator(s)	Sideline reporter(s)
January 1, 2010	ABC	Brent Musburger	Kirk Herbstreit	Lisa Salters
January 1, 2009	ABC	Brent Musburger	Kirk Herbstreit	Lisa Salters
January 1, 2008	ABC	Brent Musburger	Kirk Herbstreit	Lisa Salters
January 1, 2007	ABC	Brent Musburger	Bob Davie and Kirk Herbstreit	Lisa Salters
January 4, 2006	ABC	Keith Jackson	Dan Fouts	Todd Harris and Holly Rowe
January 1, 2005	ABC	Keith Jackson	Dan Fouts	Todd Harris
January 1, 2004	ABC	Keith Jackson	Dan Fouts	Todd Harris
January 1, 2003	ABC	Brent Musburger	Gary Danielson	Jack Arute
January 3, 2002	ABC	Keith Jackson	Tim Brant	Todd Harris and Lynn Swann
January 1, 2001	ABC	Keith Jackson	Tim Brant	Todd Harris
January 1, 2000	ABC	Keith Jackson	Dan Fouts	Todd Harris
January 1, 1999	ABC	Keith Jackson	Bob Griese	Lynn Swann
January 1, 1998	ABC	Keith Jackson	Bob Griese	Lynn Swann
January 1, 1997	ABC	Brent Musburger	Dick Vermeil	Jack Arute
January 1, 1996	ABC	Keith Jackson	Bob Griese	Lynn Swann
January 2, 1995	ABC	Keith Jackson	Bob Griese	
January 1, 1994	ABC	Keith Jackson	Bob Griese	
January 1, 1993	ABC	Brent Musburger	Dick Vermeil	
January 1, 1992	ABC	Keith Jackson	Bob Griese	
January 1, 1991	ABC	Keith Jackson	Bob Griese	
January 1, 1990	ABC	Keith Jackson	Bob Griese	Mike Adamle and Jack Arute
January 2, 1989	ABC	Keith Jackson	Bob Griese	Mike Adamle

=== Sugar Bowl ===
From 1999 to 2006, the game aired on ABC as part of its BCS package, where it had also been televised from 1969 through 1998. The Sugar Bowl was the only Bowl Alliance game to stick with ABC following the 1995, 1996 and 1997 seasons; the Fiesta and Orange Bowls were televised by CBS.

Date	Network	Play-by-play	Color commentator(s)	Sideline reporter(s)
January 2, 2006	ABC	Brad Nessler	Bob Griese	Lynn Swann
January 3, 2005	ABC	Mike Tirico	Tim Brant and Terry Bowden	Suzy Shuster
January 4, 2004	ABC	Brent Musburger	Gary Danielson	Jack Arute and Lynn Swann
January 1, 2003	ABC	Brad Nessler	Bob Griese	Lynn Swann
January 1, 2002	ABC	Mike Tirico	David Norrie	Jerry Punch
January 2, 2001	ABC	Brent Musburger	Gary Danielson	Jack Arute
January 4, 2000	ABC	Brent Musburger	Gary Danielson	Jack Arute and Lynn Swann
January 1, 1999	ABC	Brent Musburger	Dan Fouts	Jack Arute
January 1, 1998	ABC	Brent Musburger	Dan Fouts	
January 2, 1997	ABC	Keith Jackson	Bob Griese	Lynn Swann
December 31, 1995	ABC	Mark Jones	Todd Blackledge	Dean Blevins
January 2, 1995	ABC	Brent Musburger	Dick Vermeil	
January 1, 1994	ABC	Brent Musburger	Dick Vermeil	
January 1, 1993	ABC	Keith Jackson	Bob Griese	
January 1, 1992	ABC	Al Michaels	Frank Gifford and Dan Dierdorf	
January 1, 1991	ABC	Al Michaels	Frank Gifford and Dan Dierdorf	
January 1, 1990	ABC	Al Michaels	Frank Gifford and Dan Dierdorf	Lynn Swann
January 2, 1989	ABC	Al Michaels	Frank Gifford and Dan Dierdorf	Lynn Swann
January 1, 1988	ABC	Keith Jackson	Bob Griese	Mike Adamle
January 1, 1987	ABC	Keith Jackson	Tim Brant	
January 1, 1986	ABC	Keith Jackson	Tim Brant	Frank Broyles
January 1, 1985	ABC	Keith Jackson	Tim Brant	Frank Broyles
January 2, 1984	ABC	Keith Jackson	Tim Brant	Frank Broyles
January 1, 1983	ABC	Keith Jackson	Jim Lampley	Frank Broyles
January 1, 1982	ABC	Keith Jackson	Bill Flemming	Frank Broyles
January 1, 1981	ABC	Keith Jackson	Bill Flemming	Frank Broyles
January 1, 1980	ABC	Keith Jackson	Bill Flemming	Ara Parseghian
January 1, 1979	ABC	Keith Jackson	Frank Broyles	Jim Lampley
January 1, 1978	ABC	Keith Jackson	Ara Parseghian	
January 1, 1977	ABC	Keith Jackson	Ara Parseghian	
December 31, 1975	ABC	Keith Jackson	Bud Wilkinson	
December 31, 1974	ABC	Keith Jackson	Barry Switzer	
December 31, 1973	ABC	Chris Schenkel	Bud Wilkinson and Howard Cosell	
December 31, 1972	ABC	Chris Schenkel	Bud Wilkinson	
January 1, 1972	ABC	Chris Schenkel	Bud Wilkinson	
January 1, 1971	ABC	Chris Schenkel	Bud Wilkinson	
January 1, 1970	ABC	Chris Schenkel	Bud Wilkinson	

== Other bowl games ==
=== Citrus Bowl ===
The bowl has been broadcast by Mizlou (1976–1983), NBC (1984–1985), and ABC since then, with the exception of ESPN for the 2011 and 2012 editions.

=== Gator Bowl ===
Date	Network	Play-by-play	Color commentator(s)	Sideline reporter(s)
December 30, 1985	ABC	Al Michaels	Lee Grosscup	Al Trautwig
December 28, 1984	ABC	Al Michaels	Lee Grosscup	Lynn Swann
December 30, 1983	ABC	Al Michaels	Frank Broyles	Tim Brant
December 30, 1982	ABC	Al Michaels	Lee Grosscup	Anne Simon
December 28, 1981	ABC	Al Michaels	Ara Parseghian	Steve Davis
December 29, 1980	ABC	Al Michaels	Ara Parseghian	Steve Davis
December 28, 1979	ABC	Keith Jackson	Frank Broyles	Dave Diles
December 29, 1978	ABC	Keith Jackson	Ara Parseghian	
December 30, 1977	ABC	Keith Jackson	Frank Broyles	
December 27, 1976	ABC	Keith Jackson	Ara Parseghian	
December 29, 1975	ABC	Keith Jackson	Ara Parseghian	
December 30, 1974	ABC			
December 29, 1973	ABC			
December 30, 1972	ABC	Bill Flemming	Lee Grosscup	
December 28, 1968	ABC			
December 30, 1967	ABC	Keith Jackson	Bud Wilkinson	
December 31, 1966	ABC	Chris Schenkel	Bud Wilkinson	Bill Flemming
December 31, 1965	ABC	Chris Schenkel	Johnny Lujack	
January 2, 1965	ABC	Curt Gowdy	Paul Christman	

=== Las Vegas Bowl ===
The Las Vegas Bowl has been televised by ABC since 2013; ABC also televised the game in 2001. Other editions of the game were broadcast by ESPN or ESPN2.

=== Liberty Bowl ===
Since 1990, the game has been broadcast predominantly by ESPN, with some editions on ABC.

Date	Network	Play-by-play	Color Commentator(s)	Sideline Reporter(s)
December 30, 2017	ABC	Mike Patrick	Tommy Tuberville	
December 31, 2011	ABC	Dave LaMont	Ray Bentley	Quint Kessenich
December 30, 1995	ABC			
December 27, 1980	ABC	Jim Lampley	Steve Davis	
December 22, 1979	ABC	Keith Jackson	Ara Parseghian	Verne Lundquist
December 23, 1978	ABC	Chris Schenkel	Ara Parseghian	Verne Lundquist
December 19, 1977	ABC	Keith Jackson	Frank Broyles	
December 20, 1976	ABC	Keith Jackson	Ara Parseghian	
December 20, 1971	ABC	Chris Schenkel	Bud Wilkinson	
December 12, 1970	ABC			
December 13, 1969	ABC	Chris Schenkel	Bud Wilkinson	

== See also ==
- CBS college bowl game broadcasts
- Fox college bowl game broadcasts
- NBC college bowl game broadcasts
