= Drew Crompton =

American state employee (born 1968)

Judge of the Pennsylvania Commonwealth Court
- In office January 6, 2020 – January 3, 2022
- Appointed by: Tom Wolf
- Preceded by: Robert Simpson
- Succeeded by: Stacy Wallace

Personal details
- Born: John Andrew Crompton; May 7, 1968 (age 58)
- Party: Republican
- Education: Dickinson College; Widener University Commonwealth Law School (JD)

John Andrew "Drew" Crompton (born May 7, 1968) was a Judge of the Commonwealth Court of Pennsylvania. Previously, he served as chief of staff and counsel for Pennsylvania Senate Pro-Tempore Joe Scarnati. He served as deputy campaign manager for policy for Lynn Swann's 2006 campaign for Governor of Pennsylvania. Prior to that, he was chief counsel for Scarnati's predecessor as Pennsylvania Senate Pro-Tempore, Robert Jubelirer.

== Career ==
The Pennsylvania Report named him to the 2003 "The Pennsylvania Report Power 75" list of influential figures in Pennsylvania politics and noted that Crompton and his colleague Donna Malpezzi were the best attorneys in the Pennsylvania State Capitol." In 2002, he was named to the PoliticsPA list of "Rising Stars" in Pennsylvania politics.

The political newspaper The Insider called him the next generation's Mike Long and Steve MacNett.

The Caucus team of reporters uncovered that Drew Crompton authorized the legal representation of former senate employee Justin Ferranti, who had been accused of sexually harassing two female senate staff, Crompton defended his actions publicly.
