= USFL (disambiguation) =

The United States Football League was a major American spring football league operated between 1983 and 1985.

USFL may also refer to:

== American football ==
- United States Football League (2010), or New United States Football League, a proposed American spring football minor league that never played a game
- United States Football League (2022), an American spring football minor league (2022–2023)
- USFL on ABC, televised broadcasts of the 1983 league
- USFL on Fox, televised broadcasts of the 2022 league

== Other uses ==
- University of San Francisco School of Law (USF Law, USF-L), San Francisco, California, USA

== See also ==
- United States Football League (disambiguation)
- UFL (disambiguation)
- AFL (disambiguation)
- USAFL
