= Israel González =

Israel González may refer to:

- Israel González (basketball) (born 1975), Spanish basketball coach
- Israel González (boxer) (born 1996), Mexican boxer
