= CBS college bowl game broadcasts =

CBS held the rights to airing the Cotton Bowl Classic beginning in 1958. It added the Sun Bowl in 1968, which continues to air on CBS as of 2025. From 1974 to 1977, it also aired the Fiesta Bowl, and from 1978 to 1986 it carried the Peach Bowl.

== History ==
As the 1990s began, CBS' Division I-A college football coverage was reduced to its bowl game contracts, which it had with the then-John Hancock (reverted to Sun Bowl in 1994), Cotton and the then-Blockbuster bowls. However, it lost the rights to the Cotton Bowl to NBC after the 1992 game, leaving the network with just two bowl games to round out its college football coverage.

For 1995, CBS re-acquired the rights to the Cotton Bowl Classic and also gained rights to the Fiesta Bowl and the Orange Bowl from NBC. This was an important move for CBS as those two bowls would become part of the Bowl Alliance with the Sugar Bowl beginning that season; the goal was to try to guarantee an undisputed national champion in college football, something its predecessor the Bowl Coalition had also tried but did not fully succeed in doing.

Under the terms of the contract, which ran from 1995 through 1997, the Bowl Alliance games would be scheduled for New Year's Eve, New Year's Night, and January 2 with the last of the three serving as the national championship game. CBS would thus be guaranteed two national championship game matchups, with the Sugar Bowl airing on ABC.

CBS was the first network to air a Bowl Alliance national championship game, as Nebraska defeated Florida in the 1996 Fiesta Bowl (on the same token, CBS also aired the last Bowl Alliance national championship game, where Nebraska defeated Tennessee in the 1998 Orange Bowl to split that year's national championship vote as Michigan, which was #1 in both the AP and Coaches Polls going into the bowls, with the latter contractually obligated to name the Nebraska–Tennessee winner as the national champion, was obligated to play in that year's Rose Bowl). CBS also continued to air the Sun Bowl, but lost the rights to the Carquest Bowl after the game was moved from New Year's Day following the Orange Bowl's move to the home of the Carquest Bowl, Joe Robbie Stadium.

CBS lost the rights to three of its bowl games following the 1997 season, as ABC gained the rights to the Orange and Fiesta Bowls as the exclusive television home of the newly formed Bowl Championship Series and Fox acquired the rights to the Cotton Bowl Classic.

=== List of broadcasters ===
==== Blockbuster Bowl ====
Date	Network	Play-by-play announcers	Color commentators	Sideline reporters
December 30, 1995	CBS	Verne Lundquist	Pat Haden	
January 2, 1995	CBS	Verne Lundquist	Dan Fouts	Michele Tafoya
January 1, 1994	CBS	Verne Lundquist	Dan Fouts	
January 1, 1993	CBS	Jim Nantz	Randy Cross	
December 28, 1991	CBS	Jim Nantz	Dan Fouts	

==== Cotton Bowl Classic ====
During the 1980 game, CBS announcer Lindsey Nelson was stricken with laryngitis and had to leave the telecast after the first quarter. Sideline reporter Frank Glieber took over the play-by-play for the remainder of the game.

Date	Network	Play-by-play	Color commentator(s)	Sideline reporter(s)
January 1, 1992	CBS	Jim Nantz	Terry Bradshaw	Jim Gray
January 1, 1991	CBS	Jim Nantz	Tim Brant	John Dockery
January 1, 1990	CBS	Jim Nantz	Pat Haden	
January 2, 1989	CBS	Verne Lundquist	Pat Haden	
January 1, 1988	CBS	Brent Musburger	Pat Haden	
January 1, 1987	CBS	Verne Lundquist	Pat Haden and Ara Parseghian	
January 1, 1986	CBS	Brent Musburger	Ara Parseghian	
January 1, 1985	CBS	Lindsey Nelson	Pat Haden	
January 2, 1984	CBS	Lindsey Nelson	Pat Haden	
January 1, 1983	CBS	Lindsey Nelson	Pat Haden	Pat O'Brien
January 1, 1982	CBS	Lindsey Nelson	Roger Staubach	Frank Glieber
January 1, 1981	CBS	Lindsey Nelson	Roger Staubach	Frank Glieber
January 1, 1980	CBS	Lindsey Nelson	Paul Hornung	Frank Glieber
January 1, 1979	CBS	Lindsey Nelson	Paul Hornung	Frank Glieber
January 2, 1978	CBS	Lindsey Nelson	Paul Hornung and Paul Alexander	Don Criqui
January 1, 1977	CBS	Lindsey Nelson	Paul Hornung	
January 1, 1976	CBS	Lindsey Nelson	Alex Hawkins	
January 1, 1975	CBS	Lindsey Nelson	Johnny Sauer	
January 1, 1974	CBS	Lindsey Nelson	Tom Brookshier	
January 1, 1973	CBS	Lindsey Nelson	Tom Brookshier	
January 1, 1972	CBS	Lindsey Nelson	Tom Brookshier	
January 1, 1971	CBS	Lindsey Nelson	Tom Brookshier	
January 1, 1970	CBS	Lindsey Nelson	Tom Brookshier	
January 1, 1969	CBS	Frank Glieber	Eddie LeBaron	
January 1, 1968	CBS	Lindsey Nelson	Johnny Sauer	
December 31, 1966	CBS	Jack Drees	Pat Summerall	
January 1, 1966	CBS	Jack Whitaker	Frank Gifford	
January 1, 1965	CBS	Jack Buck	George Connor	
January 1, 1964	CBS	Chris Schenkel	Pat Summerall	
January 1, 1963	CBS	Lindsey Nelson	Terry Brennan	
January 1, 1962	CBS	Chris Schenkel	Johnny Lujack	
January 2, 1961	CBS	Jack Drees	Terry Brennan	
January 1, 1960	CBS	Jack Drees	Forest Evashevski	
January 1, 1959	CBS	Tom Harmon	Darrell Royal	
January 1, 1958	CBS	Tom Harmon	Forest Evashevski	

==== Fiesta Bowl ====
Date	Network	Play-by-play	Color commentator(s)	Sideline reporter(s)
December 31, 1997	CBS	Tim Brando	Ed Cunningham	
January 1, 1997	CBS	Jim Nantz	Terry Donahue	
January 2, 1996	CBS	Jim Nantz	Terry Donahue	
December 25, 1977	CBS	Lindsey Nelson	Tom Matte	Tim Ryan
December 25, 1976	CBS	Lindsey Nelson	Paul Hornung	
December 26, 1975	CBS	Pat Summerall	Tom Brookshier	
December 28, 1974	CBS	Ray Scott	Wayne Walker	Phyllis George

==== Gator Bowl ====
CBS Sports took over the television contract in 2007 and held the rights for four years.

Date	Network	Play-by-play announcers	Color commentators	Sideline reporters
January 1, 2010	CBS	Verne Lundquist	Gary Danielson	Tracy Wolfson
January 1, 2009	CBS	Craig Bolerjack	Dan Fouts and Steve Beuerlein	
January 1, 2008	CBS	Verne Lundquist	Gary Danielson	Tracy Wolfson
January 1, 2007	CBS	Verne Lundquist	Gary Danielson	Tracy Wolfson
December 31, 1987	CBS	Verne Lundquist	Dick Vermeil	John Dockery
December 27, 1986	CBS	Verne Lundquist	Pat Haden	John Dockery

==== Orange Bowl ====
Date	Network	Play-by-play	Color commentator	Sideline reporters
January 2, 1998	CBS	Sean McDonough	Terry Donahue	Ed Cunningham
December 31, 1996	CBS	Sean McDonough	Mike Mayock	Dave Logan
January 1, 1996	CBS	Sean McDonough	Pat Haden	
January 2, 1961	CBS	Ray Scott	Paul Christman	
January 1, 1960	CBS	Joe Boland	Paul Christman	
January 1, 1959	CBS	Joe Boland	Jim McKay	
January 1, 1958	CBS	Chris Schenkel	Johnny Lujack	
January 1, 1957	CBS	Tom Harmon		
January 2, 1956	CBS	Tom Harmon	Chris Schenkel	
January 1, 1955	CBS	Bob Neal		
January 1, 1954	CBS	Red Barber		
January 1, 1953	CBS	Red Barber		

==== Peach Bowl ====
Date	Network	Play-by-play announcers	Color commentators	Sideline reporters
December 31, 1985	CBS	Gary Bender	Steve Davis	
December 31, 1984	CBS	Verne Lundquist	Steve Davis	
December 30, 1983	CBS	Verne Lundquist	Steve Davis	
December 31, 1982	CBS	Verne Lundquist	Steve Davis	
December 31, 1981	CBS	Frank Glieber	Johnny Morris	Dick Stockton
January 2, 1981	CBS	Curt Gowdy	Hank Stram	Frank Glieber
December 31, 1979	CBS	Gary Bender	Sonny Jurgensen	
December 25, 1978	CBS	Lindsey Nelson	Paul Hornung	

==== Sun Bowl ====
As previously mentioned, from 1968 until the present, the game has been broadcast by CBS Sports. The Sun Bowl's contract with CBS Sports is the longest continuous relationship between a bowl game and one TV network.

== See also ==
- ABC college bowl game broadcasts
- Fox college bowl game broadcasts
- NBC college bowl game broadcasts
