= List of 2021–22 EuroLeague transactions =

This is a list of all personnel changes for the 2021 EuroLeague off-season and 2021–22 EuroLeague season.

== Retirements ==
The following players retired during the 2020–21 EuroLeague, having played in more than three EuroLeague seasons.

Date	Name	EuroLeague Team(s) and played (years)	Age	Notes	Ref.
June 24	(Spain) Felipe Reyes	(Spain) Estudiantes (1998–2004); (Spain) Real Madrid (2004–2021)	41	2× EuroLeague champion (2015, 2018); All-EuroLeague First Team (2015)	
June 26	(Greece) Vassilis Spanoulis	(Greece) Panathinaikos (2005–2006, 2007–2010); (Greece) Olympiacos (2010–2021)	38	3× EuroLeague champion (2009, 2012, 2013); EuroLeague 2010–20 All-Decade Team (2020); EuroLeague MVP (2013); 3× EuroLeague Final Four MVP (2009, 2012, 2013); EuroLeague Finals Top Scorer (2013); 8× All-EuroLeague Team (2006, 2009, 2011–2015, 2018)	
June 28	(Greece) Nikos Zisis	(Greece) AEK Athens (2000–2005, 2020–2021); (Italy) Benetton Treviso (2005–2007); (Russia) CSKA Moscow (2007–2009); (Italy) Montepaschi Siena (2009–2012); (Spain) Bilbao Basket (2012–2013); (Russia) UNICS Kazan (2013–2014); (Turkey) Fenerbahçe (2014–2015); (Germany) Brose Bamberg (2015–2019)	37	1× EuroLeague champion (2008)	
July 9	(Greece) Ioannis Bourousis	(Greece) AEK Athens (2001–2006); (Spain) Barcelona (2006); (Greece) Olympiacos (2006–2011); (Italy) Olimpia Milano (2011–2013); (Spain) Real Madrid (2013–2015); (Spain) Baskonia (2015–2016)	37	1× EuroLeague champion (2015); 2× All-EuroLeague First Team (2009, 2016)	
July 17	(Greece) Stratos Perperoglou	(Greece) Panathinaikos (2008–2012); (Greece) Olympiacos (2012–2014); (Turkey) Anadolu Efes (2014–2015); (Spain) Barcelona (2015–2017); (Israel) Hapoel Jerusalem (2017–2018); (Serbia) Crvena Zvezda (2018–2020)	36	3× EuroLeague champion (2009, 2011, 2013)	
July 18	(Israel) Omri Casspi	(Israel) Maccabi Tel Aviv (2005–2009, 2019–2021)	33		

== Managerial changes ==
=== Managerial changes ===
Team	Outgoing manager	Manner of departure	Date of vacancy	Position in table	Replaced with	Date of appointment
(Greece) Panathinaikos	(Israel) Oded Kattash	Mutual consent	26 June 2021	Pre-season	(Greece) Dimitrios Priftis	26 June 2021
(Russia) UNICS	(Greece) Dimitrios Priftis	Signed by Panathinaikos	26 June 2021	Pre-season	(Croatia) Velimir Perasović	29 June 2021
(Turkey) Fenerbahçe	(Serbia) Igor Kokoškov	Parted ways	27 July 2021	Pre-season	(Serbia) Aleksandar Đorđević	31 July 2021
(Germany) Alba Berlin	(Spain) Aíto García Reneses	Sabbatical	17 August 2021	Pre-season	(Spain) Israel González	17 August 2021
(Lithuania) Žalgiris	(Austria) Martin Schiller	Sacked	08 October 2021	18th (0–2)	(Slovenia) Jure Zdovc	8 October 2021
(Spain) Baskonia	(Montenegro) Duško Ivanović	Sacked	15 November 2021	16th (3–6)	(Croatia) Neven Spahija	15 November 2021
Monaco	(Montenegro) Zvezdan Mitrović	Sacked	13 December 2021	14th (5–9)	(Serbia) Saša Obradović	13 December 2021

== Player movements ==
=== Between two EuroLeague teams ===
Date	Player	From	To	Contract years	Ref.
June 11	(United States) Thomas Walkup	(Lithuania) Žalgiris	(Greece) Olympiacos	3	
June 12	(Lithuania) Marius Grigonis	(Lithuania) Žalgiris	(Russia) CSKA Moscow	3	
June 14	(United States) Jordan Loyd	(Serbia) Crvena zvezda	(Russia) Zenit Saint Petersburg	2	
June 18	(Germany) Niels Giffey	(Germany) Alba Berlin	(Lithuania) Žalgiris	1+1	
June 23	(France) Moustapha Fall	(France) ASVEL	(Greece) Olympiacos	2	
June 24	(United States) Pierriá Henry	(Spain) Baskonia	(Turkey) Fenerbahçe	1+1	
June 24	(United States) Jalen Reynolds	(Germany) Bayern Munich	(Israel) Maccabi Tel Aviv	2	
June 25	(Greece) Dinos Mitoglou	(Greece) Panathinaikos	(Italy) Olimpia Milano	2	
June 29	(Italy) Achille Polonara	(Spain) Baskonia	(Turkey) Fenerbahçe	2+1	
June 29	(United States) Aaron White	(Greece) Panathinaikos	(Serbia) Crvena zvezda	2	
July 1	(Turkey) Sertaç Şanlı	(Turkey) Anadolu Efes	(Spain) Barcelona	2	
July 6	(France) Thomas Heurtel	(France) ASVEL	(Spain) Real Madrid	1	
July 9	(Italy) Simone Fontecchio	(Germany) Alba Berlin	(Spain) Baskonia	3	
July 10	(United States) Wade Baldwin IV	(Germany) Bayern Munich	(Spain) Baskonia	1	
July 10	(Lithuania) Edgaras Ulanovas	(Turkey) Fenerbahçe	(Lithuania) Žalgiris	1	
July 12	(France) Guerschon Yabusele	(France) ASVEL	(Spain) Real Madrid	1	
July 13	(Uruguay) Jayson Granger	(Germany) Alba Berlin	(Spain) Baskonia	1+1	
July 14	(United States) Okaro White	(Russia) UNICS	(Greece) Panathinaikos	1+1	
July 16	(United States) Darrun Hilliard	(Russia) CSKA Moscow	(Germany) Bayern Munich	1	
July 20	(United States) Chris Jones	(Israel) Maccabi Tel Aviv	(France) ASVEL	1	
July 21	(United States) Othello Hunter	(Israel) Maccabi Tel Aviv	(Germany) Bayern Munich	1	
July 21	(Lithuania) Rokas Jokubaitis	(Lithuania) Žalgiris	(Spain) Barcelona	4	
July 23	(United States) Lorenzo Brown	(Turkey) Fenerbahçe	(Russia) UNICS	1	
July 23	(Hungary) Ádám Hanga	(Spain) Barcelona	(Spain) Real Madrid	2	
July 25	(Nigeria) Tonye Jekiri	(Spain) Baskonia	(Russia) UNICS	1	
July 28	(Argentina) Nicolás Laprovíttola	(Spain) Real Madrid	(Spain) Barcelona	2	
July 29	(Latvia) Jānis Strēlnieks	(Russia) CSKA Moscow	(Lithuania) Žalgiris	1	
July 29	(France) Léo Westermann	(Spain) Barcelona	Monaco	1	
July 30	(United States) Corey Walden	(Serbia) Crvena zvezda	(Germany) Bayern Munich	2	
July 31	(Croatia) Mario Hezonja	(Greece) Panathinaikos	(Russia) UNICS	1+1	
August 6	(Israel) Yovel Zoosman	(Israel) Maccabi Tel Aviv	(Germany) Alba Berlin	3	
August 11	(United States) Nate Wolters	(Russia) UNICS	(Serbia) Crvena zvezda	1	
August 15	(Cameroon) Landry Nnoko	(Serbia) Crvena zvezda	(Spain) Baskonia	1	
August 16	(Senegal) Youssoupha Fall	(Spain) Baskonia	(France) ASVEL	1	
August 17	(United States) Austin Hollins	(Russia) Zenit Saint Petersburg	(Serbia) Crvena zvezda	1	
August 21	(United States) Jeremy Evans	(Italy) Olimpia Milano	(Greece) Panathinaikos	1	
August 22	(United States) Nigel Hayes	(Lithuania) Žalgiris	(Spain) Barcelona	1	
August 23	(Greece) Tyler Dorsey	(Israel) Maccabi Tel Aviv	(Greece) Olympiacos	1	
August 24	(United States) Augustine Rubit	(Lithuania) Žalgiris	(Germany) Bayern Munich	1	
September 13	(United States) Will Thomas	(Russia) Zenit Saint Petersburg	Monaco	1	
September 17	(United States) Mike James	(Russia) CSKA Moscow	Monaco	1	
September 25	(United States) James Gist	(Germany) Bayern Munich	(France) ASVEL	3 months	
September 27	(France) Mathias Lessort	Monaco	(Israel) Maccabi Tel Aviv	2 months	
October 30	(Slovenia) Zoran Dragić	(Spain) Baskonia	(Lithuania) Žalgiris	1	
12 November	(United States) Marcos Knight	Monaco	(France) ASVEL	3 months	
11 December	(United States) K.C. Rivers	(Russia) Zenit Saint Petersburg	(Germany) Bayern Munich	1	
21 December	(United States) Jehyve Floyd	(Greece) Panathinaikos	(Turkey) Fenerbahçe	1	

=== To a EuroLeague team ===
Date	Player	From	To	Contract years	Ref.
June 7	(Russia) Sergey Karasev	(Russia) Khimki	(Russia) Zenit Saint Petersburg	1	
June 15	(United States) Tyler Cavanaugh	(Spain) Tenerife	(Lithuania) Žalgiris	2+1	
June 16	(United States) Devin Booker	(Russia) Khimki	(Turkey) Fenerbahçe	2	
June 18	(Germany) Ismet Akpinar	(Turkey) Bahçeşehir	(Turkey) Fenerbahçe	1+1	
June 18	(Montenegro) Nikola Ivanović	(Montenegro) Budućnost	(Serbia) Crvena zvezda	2	
June 18	(Serbia) Luka Mitrović	(Montenegro) Budućnost	(Serbia) Crvena zvezda	1	
June 19	(Italy) Davide Alviti	(Italy) Trieste	(Italy) Olimpia Milano	3	
June 20	(United States) Devon Hall	(Germany) Brose Bamberg	(Italy) Olimpia Milano	2	
June 21	(United States) Conner Frankamp	(Spain) Murcia	(Russia) Zenit Saint Petersburg	1	
June 21	(Lithuania) Mantas Kalnietis	(Russia) Lokomotiv Kuban	(Lithuania) Žalgiris	2	
June 21	(United States) Josh Nebo	(Israel) Hapoel Eilat	(Lithuania) Žalgiris	1+1	
June 21	(Canada) Marial Shayok	(Turkey) Bursaspor	(Turkey) Fenerbahçe	1+1	
June 25	(Russia) Dmitry Kulagin	(Russia) Lokomotiv Kuban	(Russia) Zenit Saint Petersburg	1	
June 27	(United States) James Nunnally	(United States) New Orleans Pelicans	(Israel) Maccabi Tel Aviv	1	
June 29	(Turkey) Metecan Birsen	(Turkey) Pinar Karşıyaka	(Turkey) Fenerbahçe	2	
June 29	(France) Victor Wembanyama	(France) Nanterre	(France) ASVEL	3	
June 30	(United States) Derrick Williams	(Spain) Valencia	(Israel) Maccabi Tel Aviv	2	
July 1	(United States) Jerian Grant	(Greece) Promitheas Patras	(Italy) Olimpia Milano	2	
July 1	(United States) Kameron Taylor	(Germany) Hamburg Towers	(Israel) Maccabi Tel Aviv	2	
July 2	(United States) Raymar Morgan	(Turkey) Pinar Karşıyaka	(France) ASVEL	1	
July 2	(Serbia) Ognjen Jaramaz	(Serbia) Partizan	(Germany) Bayern Munich	3	
July 2	(Russia) Vyacheslav Zaytsev	(Russia) Khimki	(Russia) UNICS	1+1	
July 3	(Serbia) Stefan Lazarević	(Serbia) FMP	(Serbia) Crvena zvezda	1	
July 4	(Israel) Yiftach Ziv	(Israel) Hapoel Gilboa Galil	(Israel) Maccabi Tel Aviv	2+1	
July 5	(United States) (Israel) Jake Cohen	(Spain) Obradoiro	(Israel) Maccabi Tel Aviv	2	
July 5	(United States) Matt Costello	(Spain) Gran Canaria	(Spain) Baskonia	3	
July 5	(Lithuania) Mindaugas Kuzminskas	(Russia) Lokomotiv Kuban	(Russia) Zenit Saint Petersburg	1	
July 6	(Serbia) Danilo Anđušić	(France) Bourg	Monaco	1	
July 6	(France) Jerry Boutsiele	(France) Limoges	Monaco	1	
July 6	(United States) Keenan Evans	(Israel) Hapoel Haifa	(Israel) Maccabi Tel Aviv	1+1+1	
July 6	(Greece) Michalis Lountzis	(Greece) Promitheas Patras	(Greece) Olympiacos	3	
July 6	(Germany) Andreas Obst	(Germany) Ratiopharm Ulm	(Germany) Bayern Munich	2	
July 6	(United States) Kendrick Perry	(Slovenia) Cedevita Olimpija	(Greece) Panathinaikos	1+1	
July 6	(Italy) Giampaolo Ricci	(Italy) Virtus Bologna	(Italy) Olimpia Milano	2	
July 7	(Serbia) Vanja Marinković	(Spain) Valencia	(Spain) Baskonia	3	
July 7	(United States) Jordan Mickey	(Russia) Khimki	(Russia) Zenit Saint Petersburg	1	
July 7	(France) Armel Traoré	(France) Centre Fédéral	Monaco	1	
July 8	(Israel) Tamir Blatt	(Israel) Hapoel Jerusalem	(Germany) Alba Berlin	2	
July 8	(Russia) Artem Komolov	(Russia) Nizhny Novgorod	(Russia) UNICS	1+1	
July 8	(Russia) Andrey Vorontsevich	(Russia) Nizhny Novgorod	(Russia) UNICS	1+1	
July 9	(Italy) Nicolò Melli	(United States) Dallas Mavericks	(Italy) Olimpia Milano	3	
July 9	(Austria) Marvin Ogunsipe	(Germany) Hamburg Towers	(Germany) Bayern Munich	1	
July 9	(France) Elie Okobo	(United States) Long Island Nets	(France) ASVEL	1	
July 9	(Germany) Gavin Schilling	(Germany) Löwen Braunschweig	(Germany) Bayern Munich	1	
July 12	(United States) Troy Daniels	(United States) Denver Nuggets	(Italy) Olimpia Milano	1	
July 12	(United States) Daryl Macon	(Greece) AEK	(Greece) Panathinaikos	1+1	
July 13	(Russia) Vladimir Ivlev	(Russia) Parma	(Russia) CSKA Moscow	1	
July 13	(United States) Nigel Williams-Goss	(Russia) Lokomotiv Kuban	(Spain) Real Madrid	2	
July 14	(United States) Paris Lee	(France) Orléans	Monaco	1	
July 14	(United States) Dylan Osetkowski	(Germany) Ratiopharm Ulm	(France) ASVEL	2	
July 14	(Russia) Evgeny Valiev	(Russia) Khimki	(Russia) UNICS	1	
July 15	(Serbia) Nikola Kalinić	(Spain) Valencia	(Serbia) Crvena zvezda	2	
July 16	(Greece) Kostas Antetokounmpo	(United States) Los Angeles Lakers	(France) ASVEL	2	
July 19	(United States) Jehyve Floyd	(Israel) Hapoel Gilboa Galil	(Greece) Panathinaikos	1+1	
July 19	(United States) Shabazz Napier	(United States) Washington Wizards	(Russia) Zenit Saint Petersburg	1	
July 20	(France) Yakuba Ouattara	(Spain) Real Betis	Monaco	1	
July 21	(Israel) Roman Sorkin	(Israel) Maccabi Haifa	(Israel) Maccabi Tel Aviv	1+1	
July 23	(Germany) Joshua Obiesie	(Germany) Würzburg	(Germany) Bayern Munich	2	
July 31	(Greece) Vassilis Kavvadas	(Greece) Iraklis	(Greece) Panathinaikos	1+1	
August 5	(United States) Donta Hall	(United States) Orlando Magic	Monaco	2	
August 10	(United States) Deshaun Thomas	(Japan) Alvark Tokyo	(Germany) Bayern Munich	1	
August 12	(Russia) Alexey Shved	(Russia) Khimki	(Russia) CSKA Moscow	1+1	
August 17	(Serbia) Filip Petrušev	(Serbia) Mega Basket	(Turkey) Anadolu Efes	1	
August 18	(United States) Steven Enoch	(Spain) Obradoiro	(Spain) Baskonia	2	
August 18	(Lithuania) Donatas Motiejūnas	(China) Xinjiang Flying Tigers	Monaco	1	
August 18	(Italy) Marco Spissu	(Italy) Dinamo Sassari	(Russia) UNICS	1+1	
August 23	(Democratic Republic of the Congo) Emmanuel Mudiay	(United States) Utah Jazz	(Lithuania) Žalgiris	1	
August 24	(Israel) Ido Ben Harush	(Israel) Ironi Ashkelon	(Israel) Maccabi Tel Aviv	1	
August 25	(United States) Jaleen Smith	(Germany) Ludwigsburg	(Germany) Alba Berlin	3	
August 30	(United States) Alpha Diallo	(Greece) Lavrio	Monaco	3	
September 3	(Australia) Brock Motum	(France) Nanterre	Monaco	1	
September 12	(Turkey) Şehmus Hazer	(Turkey) Beşiktaş	(Turkey) Fenerbahçe	3	
September 20	(United States) Jarrell Brantley	(United States) Utah Jazz	(Russia) UNICS	1	
September 20	(United States) O. J. Mayo	(China) Liaoning Flying Leopards	(Russia) UNICS	1	
September 30	(Germany) Oscar da Silva	(Germany) Ludwigsburg	(Germany) Alba Berlin	3	
October 9	(United States) Kenneth Faried	(Puerto Rico) Leones de Ponce	(Russia) CSKA Moscow	2 months	
October 10	(United States) Yogi Ferrell	(United States) Los Angeles Clippers	(Greece) Panathinaikos	1	
October 18	(United States) Elijah Bryant	(United States) Milwaukee Bucks	(Turkey) Anadolu Efes	2	
October 27	(United States) Dwayne Bacon	(United States) Orlando Magic	Monaco	1	
November 2	(United States) Lamar Peters	(Turkey) Bursaspor	(Spain) Baskonia	1	
November 2	(New Zealand) Tai Webster	New Zealand Breakers	(Lithuania) Žalgiris	1	
November 9	(Serbia) Stefan Marković	(Italy) Virtus Bologna	(Serbia) Crvena zvezda	1	
November 18	(Lithuania) Regimantas Miniotas	(Spain) Bilbao	(Lithuania) Žalgiris	1	
November 22	(Italy) Tommaso Baldasso	(Italy) Fortitudo Bologna	(Italy) Olimpia Milano	2	
December 1	(Ghana) Ben Bentil	(Turkey) Bahçeşehir Koleji	(Italy) Olimpia Milano	1	
December 7	(Australia) Dante Exum	(United States) Cleveland Cavaliers	(Spain) Barcelona	2 months	
December 29	(United States) Tyson Carter	(Greece) Lavrio	(Russia) Zenit Saint Petersburg	2	
January 4	(United States) Trey Kell	(Italy) Varese	(Italy) Olimpia Milano	1	
January 7	(Turkey) Egemen Güven	(Turkey) Bursaspor	(Turkey) Anadolu Efes	2	
January 7	(Serbia) Stefan Jović	(Russia) Khimki	(Greece) Panathinaikos	1+1	
January 10	(United States) Khyri Thomas	(Spain) Bilbao	(Israel) Maccabi Tel Aviv	1+1	
January 19	(Argentina) Gabriel Deck	(United States) Oklahoma City Thunder	(Spain) Real Madrid	3	
January 23	(United States) Markel Starks	(Bosnia and Herzegovina) Igokea	(Turkey) Fenerbahçe	1	
January 31	(United States) Allerik Freeman	(Turkey) Bursaspor	(Russia) CSKA Moscow	1	
February 5	(United States) John Holland	(Puerto Rico) Cariduros de Fajardo	(Russia) UNICS	4 months	
February 23	(Canada) Kevin Pangos	(United States) Cleveland Cavaliers	(Russia) CSKA Moscow	3	

=== Leaving a EuroLeague team ===
Date	Player	From	To	Ref.
June 24	(Serbia) Marko Jagodić-Kuridža	(Serbia) Crvena zvezda	(Montenegro) Budućnost	
July 1	(United States) Jeff Brooks	(Italy) Olimpia Milano	(Italy) Reyer Venezia	
July 2	(United States) Kevarrius Hayes	(France) ASVEL	(Turkey) Bursaspor	
July 2	(United States) Kevin Punter	(Italy) Olimpia Milano	(Serbia) Partizan	
July 2	(Ukraine) Artem Pustovyi	(Spain) Barcelona	(Spain) Gran Canaria	
July 6	(France) Yohan Choupas	Monaco	(France) Lille	
July 6	(Russia) Vladislav Trushkin	(Russia) Zenit Saint Petersburg	(Russia) Lokomotiv Kuban	
July 7	(Ghana) Ben Bentil	(Greece) Panathinaikos	(Turkey) Bahçeşehir Koleji	
July 7	(United States) Zach LeDay	(Italy) Olimpia Milano	(Serbia) Partizan	
July 7	(France) Amine Noua	(France) ASVEL	(Spain) Andorra	
July 7	(United States) Jamar Smith	(Russia) UNICS	(Turkey) Bahçeşehir Koleji	
July 10	(Spain) Ilimane Diop	(Spain) Baskonia	(Spain) Gran Canaria	
July 12	(United States) Langston Hall	(Serbia) Crvena zvezda	(Turkey) Bahçeşehir Koleji	
July 12	(Serbia) Aleksa Radanov	(Serbia) Crvena zvezda	(Bosnia and Herzegovina) Igokea	
July 13	(Spain) Víctor Claver	(Spain) Barcelona	(Spain) Valencia	
July 16	(Russia) Dmitry Khvostov	(Russia) Zenit Saint Petersburg	(Russia) Nizhny Novgorod	
July 16	(Serbia) Vladimir Micov	(Italy) Olimpia Milano	(Montenegro) Budućnost	
July 17	(United States) Aaron Harrison	(Greece) Olympiacos	(Turkey) Türk Telekom	
July 18	(Germany) David Krämer	(Germany) Bayern Munich	(Germany) Löwen Braunschweig	
July 19	(Australia) Duop Reath	(Serbia) Crvena zvezda	(Australia) Illawarra Hawks	
July 20	(Italy) Diego Flaccadori	(Germany) Bayern Munich	(Italy) Trento	
July 21	(Bosnia and Herzegovina) Džanan Musa	(Turkey) Anadolu Efes	(Spain) Breogán	
July 24	(Belgium) Ismaël Bako	(France) ASVEL	(Spain) Manresa	
July 29	(Lithuania) Martinas Geben	(Lithuania) Žalgiris	(Germany) Brose Bamberg	
August 1	(Greece) Vasilis Charalampopoulos	(Greece) Olympiacos	(Italy) Reyer Venezia	
August 1	(United States) D. J. Seeley	(Germany) Bayern Munich	(Montenegro) Budućnost	
August 3	(United States) JaJuan Johnson	(Germany) Bayern Munich	(Turkey) Türk Telekom	
August 10	(Italy) Andrea Cinciarini	(Italy) Olimpia Milano	(Italy) Reggio Emilia	
August 10	(United States) Branden Frazier	Monaco	(Poland) Zielona Góra	
August 11	(United States) Dee Bost	Monaco	(Turkey) Galatasaray	
August 18	(United States) Norris Cole	(France) ASVEL	(Spain) Málaga	
August 18	(Argentina) Patricio Garino	(Lithuania) Žalgiris	(France) Nanterre 92	
August 23	(United States) Zach Auguste	(Greece) Panathinaikos	(Slovenia) Cedevita Olimpija	
December 1	(United States) Yogi Ferrell	(Greece) Panathinaikos	(Slovenia) Cedevita Olimpija	
