= United States Football League (disambiguation) =

The United States Football League was a professional league for American football in the United States that played from 1983 to 1985.

United States Football League may also refer to:

== American football ==
- United States Football League (2022–2023), United States league of springtime professional American football
- United States Football League (2010), proposed American football league

=== Television coverage ===
- United States Football League on Fox, televised sport on FOX
- United States Football League on ABC, televised sport on the American Broadcasting Corporation

== Other uses ==
- United States football league system for soccer

== See also ==
- American Football League (disambiguation)
- United Football League (disambiguation)
- United States League (disambiguation)
- USFL (disambiguation)
