= USL =

USL may refer to:

== Arts and entertainment ==
- Underground Sound of Lisbon, a Portuguese dance music project
- Urban Strawberry Lunch, a band from Liverpool

== Companies ==
- United Spirits Limited, India
- Former United States Lines shipping company

== Computing ==
- Universal Systems Language
- Former US Unix System Laboratories

== Education ==
- University of Louisiana at Lafayette, formerly University of Southwestern Louisiana, US
- University of Saint Louis Tuguegarao, Philippines

== Sports ==
- Ukrainian Second League, an association football league in Ukraine
- Ultimate Soccer League
- United Soccer League (disambiguation)
  - Former US United Soccer League (1984–85)
  - United Soccer League, the current governing body of several lower-level U.S.-based leagues
- The following North American leagues operated by the United Soccer League organization:
  - USL Championship, the second level of the U.S. men's soccer league system, which used the "United Soccer League" name from 2015–2018
  - USL League One, the third level of said system
  - USL League Two, the fourth level of said system
  - USL Super League, a planned U.S. top-level women's league set to start play in 2024
- United States League, a baseball league
- Uttarakhand Super League, an association football league in India

== Languages ==
- Ukrainian Sign Language

== Other uses ==
- Social Liberal Union, a political alliance in Romania
- Upper Specification Limit, statistical measure used in a Process Window Index bounded by UCL/LCL and USL/LSL

== See also ==
- United States League (disambiguation)
