= Steve MacNett =

American political figure

- Died: September 18, 2018
- Occupation: Attorney
- Political party: Republican

Steve MacNett was an American political figure. He was a prominent legislative aide in the Pennsylvania Senate, where he was the Senate Republican General Counsel. His influence led observers to call him the "51st Senator." He was best known as the top staffer in the Senate during the tenure of David J. Brightbill.

In a 2003 interview with MacNett, journalist Albert J. Neri said that "[a]nyone who has spent any time walking the halls of the state Capitol has heard the name, Steve MacNett, spoken with mixtures of reverence, respect and fear." In 2004 the political newsletter The Insider said that for "two decades he's been the gatekeeper on all matters legislative and a walking encyclopedia on the legislature and state government."

The Pennsylvania Report named MacNett to the 2003 "Pennsylvania Report Power 75" list of influential figures in Pennsylvania politics, calling him "Pennsylvania's most influential legislative staffer for the past 20 years," noting that "[a]t no time is this titan more important than the "Lame Duck session" as lobbyists and legislators of all stripes wait for his advice and insight." In 2009 the Pennsylvania Report named him to "The Pennsylvania Report 100" list of influential figures in Pennsylvania politics, noting that while his influence "has waned with the new leadership" in the Senate Republican Caucus, he is "[s]till a trusted friend and advisor to all members of the state Senate" and he "will continue to be a key advisor and force behind the scenes." He was named to the PoliticsPA list of "Pennsylvania's Smartest Staffers and Operatives." He was named to the PoliticsPA list of "Sy Snyder's Power 50" list of influential individuals in Pennsylvania politics in 2002, and again in 2003.

Stephen is survived by his wife Cynthia, daughters, Pamela MacNett, Colleen MacNett, and stepdaughters Catharine Thurston and Abigail Thurston.
