= United States League (disambiguation) =

The United States League was a minor Negro baseball league.

The United States League may also refer to:

- United States Baseball League, a minor league in baseball
- United States Hockey League, junior ice hockey
- United States Hockey League (1945–1951), minor league in profession ice hockey

== See also ==
- United States Football League (disambiguation)
- American League
- United League (disambiguation)
- USL (disambiguation)
