= Donna Malpezzi =

American lawyer

- Occupation: Legislative Counsel
- Political party: Republican

Donna Malpezzi is an American attorney and government official employed by the Commonwealth of Pennsylvania. Currently serving as the chief counsel for Pennsylvania Senate Majority Leader Dominic F. Pileggi, she previously worked as chief counsel for Senate Majority Leader David J. Brightbill. Prior to that, she was an attorney in the office of Senator F. Joseph Loeper.

== Biography ==
Malpezzi was hired by Pileggi's Senate office after Brightbill was defeated during the May 2006 Republican primary election, following the 2005 Pennsylvania General Assembly pay raise controversy. Prior to that, she was an attorney in the office of Senator F. Joseph Loeper.

She has become known for her legislation drafting work in the Pennsylvania General Assembly. The Insider described her as the "Brightbill Legal Eagle." In 2005 remarks to the Pennsylvania Senate, Dominic F. Pileggi noted that Malpezzi was "at the center of nearly every budget discussion for our Caucus,"

== Honors ==
The Pennsylvania Report Malpezzi to the 2003 "The Pennsylvania Report Power 75" list of influential figures in Pennsylvania politics and noted that Malpezzi and her colleague Drew Crompton were "the best attorneys in the Pennsylvania State Capitol." In 2009, she was named to the Pennsylvania Report "PA Report 100" list of politically influential individuals in Pennsylvania.
