= AFL =

AFL may refer to:

== Aviation ==
- Aeroflot, ICAO airline code AFL
- Alta Floresta Airport in State of Mato Grosso, Brazil (IATA airport code AFL)

== Education ==
- Angel Foundation for Learning, a Canadian Roman Catholic charity
- Ankara Science High School, a high school in Ankara, Turkey, natively referred to as Ankara Fen Liesi
- Assessment for learning

== Military ==
- Armed Forces of Liberia
- Armée française de la Libération or French Liberation Army, the army of Free France from 1943 to 1945
- Army of Free Lebanon, a 1970s splinter faction of the Lebanese Armed Forces

== Organized labour ==
- Alberta Federation of Labour, a provincial trade union centre chartered by the Canadian Labour Congress
- American Federation of Labor, an 1886–1955 national trade union centre that merged into the AFL-CIO
- Arbeidernes Faglige Landsorganisasjon or Workers' National Trade Union, former name of the Norwegian Confederation of Trade Unions, a national trade union

== Politics and social advocacy ==
- Actresses' Franchise League, a primarily English women's suffrage organization
- Anglicans for Life, an anti-abortion advocacy group associated with the Anglican Church in North America
- American Federation of Labor, national federation of labor unions in the US that continues today as the AFL-CIO
- Anti-Federalist League, a 1990s British political party
- Australian Freedom League, a 1910s anti-conscription organization

== Science and technology ==
- Academic Free License, a software licence
- Adaptive front light, of an automobile
- After-fader listen
- American Fuzzy Lop (software), a fuzzer
- Astrobiology Field Laboratory, a cancelled robotic rover to be sent to Mars
- Atrial flutter, a form of cardiac arrhythmia

== Sport ==
=== Australian rules football ===
- AFL (video game series), a series of Australian rules football video games
  - AFL (2011 video game), an Australian rules football video game for the Wii and iOS
- Anti-Football League, an organization that bemoans the cultural saturation of Australian rules football
- Australian Football League, an Australian rules football league that is the highest level of the sport
  - Australian rules football, a sport commonly referred to as AFL

=== Gridiron football ===
- Alberta Football League, an amateur Canadian football league
- American Football League, a name shared by several separate and unrelated professional American football leagues:
  - American Football League (1926) (a.k.a. "AFL I"), first rival of the National Football League (NFL) that competed in 1926
  - American Football League (1934), regional borderline-major league that competed in 1934
  - American Football League (1936) (a.k.a. "AFL II"), second rival of the NFL that competed in 1936 and 1937
  - American Football League (1938), minor professional league that changed its name to the American Professional Football Association in 1939
  - American Football League (1940) (a.k.a. "AFL III"), third rival of the NFL that competed in 1940 and 1941
  - American Football League (1944), offshoot of the Pacific Coast Professional Football League that competed in 1944
  - American Football League (1946), name adopted by the American Association minor American football league in 1946
  - American Football League (a.k.a. "AFL IV"), competed against the NFL from 1960 to 1970 and then merged with the NFL
- Arena Football League, an American indoor football league
- Austrian Football League, the highest league of American football in Austria

=== Other uses in sport ===
- African Football League, an association football competition run by the Confederation for African Football (CAF)
- American Fencing League, an amateur standard fencing league
- Arizona Fall League, an American off-season baseball league operated by Major League Baseball
- Artsakh Football League, association football league of the Republic of Artsakh
- Azteca Fight League, a Mexican mixed martial arts promotion
- Lisbon Football Association, an association football organisation known in Portuguese as the Associação de Futebol de Lisboa (AFL)

== Other uses ==
- Abstract family of languages
- Aflac, American insurance company (NYSE ticker: AFL)
- American Friends of Lafayette, patriotic and historical society
- Aruban florin, currency of Aruba, abbreviated as "Afl."
