= American Football League (disambiguation) =

The American Football League (1960–1969) is a football league which merged with National Football League in 1970.

American Football League may also refer to:

== Major leagues ==
- American Football League (1926), also known as AFL I (1926)
- American Football League (1936), also known as AFL II (1936–37)
- American Football League (1940), also known as AFL III (1940–41)
- American Football League (Poland), an American football league in Poland

== Minor leagues ==
- American Football League (1934), based in American South and Southwest
- American Football League (1938), evolved from Midwest Football League
- American Football League (1944), outgrowth of the Northwest War Industries League
- American Association (American football), changed its name to the American Football League in 1946

== Soccer ==
- American League of Professional Football, a professional soccer league (1894)

== See also ==
- List of leagues of American and Canadian football
- United States Football League (disambiguation)
