= Israel González (boxer) =

Mexican boxer (born 1996)

Personal information
- Nickname: Jiga
- Born: 4 December 1996 (age 29) Cabo San Lucas, Baja California Sur, Mexico
- Height: 5 ft 6 in (168 cm)
- Weight: Flyweight; Super flyweight

Boxing career
- Stance: Orthodox

Boxing record
- Total fights: 40
- Wins: 32
- Win by KO: 12
- Losses: 6
- Draws: 2

Jesús Israel González Acevedo (born 4 December 1996) is a Mexican professional boxer who has challenged four times for super flyweight world titles; the WBA and IBF titles in 2018, the WBA (Super) title in 2020 and the WBC flyweight title in 2022.

== Professional boxing record ==
40 fights	32 wins	6 losses
By knockout	12	1
By decision	20	5
Draws	2	

No.	Result	Record	Opponent	Type	Round, time	Date	Location	Notes
40	Loss	32–6–2	Kenshiro Teraji	UD	12	20 Jul 2026	Ryōgoku Kokugikan, Tokyo, Japan	For vacant WBO super flyweight title
39	Win	32–5–2	Armando Appel	UD	10	16 May 2026	Los Cabos, Mexico	Won vacant WBC Silver super flyweight title
38	Win	31–5–2	Jorge Leyva	UD	10	29 Nov 2025	Los Cabos, Mexico	
37	Win	30–5–2	Angel Ramos	UD	10	8 Dec 2024	Suleiman Al-Darrat Complex, Benghazi, Libya	
36	Win	29–5–2	Ruben Montoya Ramirez	TKO	4 (8), 0:01	12 Oct 2024	Torreón, Mexico	
35	Draw	28–5–2	Jonathan Rodriguez	SD	10	7 Jul 2023	Cintermex, Monterrey, Mexico	
34	Loss	28–5–1	Jesse Rodriguez	UD	12	17 Sep 2022	T-Mobile Arena, Las Vegas, Nevada, U.S.	For WBC super flyweight title
33	Win	28–4–1	Misael Gracia Acevedo	UD	8	2 Apr 2022	Arena La Paz, La Paz, Mexico	
32	Win	27–4–1	Samuel Gutierrez Hernandez	UD	8	29 Jan 2022	Gimnasio Beto Estrada, Piedras Negras, Mexico	
31	Draw	26–4–1	Jose Martinez	MD	10	18 Mar 2021	Albergue Olimpico, Salinas, Puerto Rico	For vacant WBO-NABO bantamweight title
30	Win	26–4	Samuel Gutierrez Hernandez	UD	8	19 Dec 2020	Burbuja de Seguridad, Cabo San Lucas, Mexico	
29	Loss	25–4	Román González	UD	12	23 Oct 2020	Gimnasio TV Azteca, Mexico City, Mexico	For WBA (Super) super flyweight title
28	Win	25–3	Sho Ishida	SD	12	28 Dec 2019	EDION Arena, Osaka, Japan	
27	Win	24–3	Jose Luis Zazueta	RTD	6 (10), 3:00	31 May 2019	La Paz, Mexico	
26	Loss	23–3	Kal Yafai	UD	12	24 Nov 2018	Casino de Monte Carlo Salle Medecin, Monte Carlo, Monaco	For WBA super flyweight title
25	Win	23–2	Daniel Arturo Vega	TKO	2 (10), 0:25	14 Aug 2018	Cancha Manuel Gómez Jiménez, La Paz, Mexico	
24	Win	22–2	Jairo Gutiérrez	KO	1 (10), 2:10	26 May 2018	Pabellón Cultural de la República, Cabo San Lucas, Mexico	
23	Loss	21–2	Jerwin Ancajas	TKO	10 (12), 1:50	3 Feb 2018	Bank of America Center, Corpus Christi, Texas, U.S.	For IBF super flyweight title
22	Win	21–1	Reymundo Hernandez	TKO	5 (8), 0:34	3 Nov 2017	Arena José Sulaimán, Monterrey, Mexico	
21	Win	20–1	Yonathan Padilla	UD	10	15 Jul 2017	Auditorio Municipal, Cabo San Lucas, Mexico	
20	Win	19–1	Luis Carrillo	KO	4 (10), 1:28	29 Apr 2017	Arena Pavillon del Norte, Saltillo, Mexico	
19	Win	18–1	Cristian Cortes	UD	8	25 Mar 2017	Gimnasio Usos Múltiples UdeG, Guadalajara, Mexico	
18	Win	17–1	Eduardo Cruz Muñoz	TKO	2 (10), 1:30	10 Dec 2016	Domo del Parque San Rafael, Guadalajara, Mexico	
17	Win	16–1	Ramon Garcia Hirales	UD	8	29 Oct 2016	Auditorio Municipal de Cabo San Lucas, Cabo San Lucas, Mexico	
16	Win	15–1	Mauricio Fuentes	TKO	4 (10)	2 Jul 2016	Auditorio Municipal de Cabo San Lus, Los Cabos, Mexico	
15	Win	14–1	Mauricio Fuentes	KO	2 (10)	14 May 2016	Auditorio Municipal, Jiquipilco, Mexico	
14	Loss	13–1	Argi Cortes	UD	6	2 Apr 2016	Centro de Convenciones, Tlalnepantla de Baz, Mexico	
13	Win	13–0	Victor Reyes	UD	6	13 Feb 2016	Piedras Negras, Mexico	
12	Win	12–0	Francisco Reyes	UD	12	19 Dec 2015	Auditorio Municipal de Cabo San Lucas, Cabo San Lucas, Mexico	Won WBC FECOMBOX interim super flyweight title
11	Win	11–0	Gonzalo García	UD	8	6 Nov 2015	Plaza de Toros La Sanluqueña, Cabo San Lucas, Mexico	
10	Win	10–0	Pablo Ramírez	UD	6	19 Sep 2015	Auditorio Municipal de Cabo San Lucas, Cabo San Lucas, Mexico	
9	Win	9–0	Diego Escobar	UD	4	22 Aug 2015	La Capilla de Sadi, Mexico City, Mexico	
8	Win	8–0	Jorge Ordaz	KO	2 (6)	25 Jul 2015	Piedras Negras, Mexico	
7	Win	7–0	Genaro Rios	UD	6	30 May 2015	Auditorio Municipal de Cabo San Lucas, Cabo San Lucas, Mexico	
6	Win	6–0	Artemio Celestino	UD	4	10 May 2015	Centro de Espectáculos, Jiquipilco, Mexico	
5	Win	5–0	Carlos Hernández	UD	4	4 Apr 2015	Gimnasio Torreón, Torreón, Mexico	
4	Win	4–0	René Casimiro	KO	1 (4), 1:43	21 Mar 2015	Auditorio Municipal de Cabo San Lucas, Cabo San Lucas, Mexico	
3	Win	3–0	Ricardo Armenta	TKO	2 (4), 1:43	14 Feb 2015	Palenque de la Expo Gan, Hermosillo, Mexico	
2	Win	2–0	Adrian Barrientos	PTS	4	12 Dec 2014	Auditorio Municipal de Cabo San Lucas, Cabo San Lucas, Mexico	
1	Win	1–0	Zenon Venancio	UD	4	14 Nov 2014	Auditorio Municipal de Cabo San Lucas, Cabo San Lucas, Mexico	
