= UFL =

UFL or ufl may refer to:

Chemistry:

- Upper flammable limit, the flammability limit describing the richest flammable mixture of a combustible gas

Colleges and universities:

- University of Florida, a public land-grant, space-grant, research university located in Gainesville, Florida
- Private University in the Principality of Liechtenstein (German: Private Universität im Fürstentum Liechtenstein), a private medical school located in Liechtenstein

Electronics:

- Hirose U.FL, a miniature coaxial RF connector for high-frequency signals manufactured by Hirose Electric Group

Organizations

- Union of Luxembourg Women, (French: Union des Femmes Luxembourgeoises)
- International Legion (Ukraine), also known as the Ukrainian Foreign Legion

Sports:

- UFL (video game), an association football simulation video game
- Ukrainian First League, association football league in Ukraine
- United Football League (1961–1964), an American football league that operated from 1961 to 1964
- United Football League (2009–2012), an American football league that operated from 2009 to 2012
- United Football League (2024–present), an American football league that began play in 2024, formed from the merger of the second USFL with the second XFL
- United Football League (Philippines), an association football league in the Philippines that operated from 2010 to 2016

== See also ==
- United Football League (disambiguation)
- Uranium fluoride (disambiguation)
- USFL (disambiguation)
