= John Verbanac =

- Education: University of Pittsburgh
- Occupation: political strategist
- Known for: The Insider, BrabenderCox

John Verbanac is a businessman and political operative in Pennsylvania.

Verbanic earned a B.A. degree from the University of Pittsburgh College of General Studies in 1990. He worked in government and politics in Washington, D.C., as a senior aide and political strategist for two U.S. senators and a member of Congress.

Verbanac worked as consultant for Forest City Enterprises and Harrah's Entertainment in their efforts to secure a casino license from the Pennsylvania Gaming Control Board. The fact that he also was worked as an informal adviser to former Pittsburgh Mayor Bob O'Connor during that time raised questions of impropriety.

Following his time on Capitol Hill, Verbanac entered into several entrepreneurial ventures and held a number of positions in other business endeavors. One of those positions was at Ketchum Communications Worldwide, a prominent public affairs firm, where he worked as vice president of public affairs. There, he handled the accounts for the Commonwealth of Pennsylvania, GNC, H. J. Heinz Company, Wal-Mart, and MCI Inc. From 1997 to 2000, Verbanac worked as executive vice president of BrabenderCox, a Pennsylvania-based marketing and advertising firm. He helped the firm restructure and launch Adams Marketing, a new venture for BrabenderCox, of which he became president.

He briefly became a partner in IdeaMill, a Pittsburgh-based branding and advertising firm. In 2001, he joined with journalist Albert J. Neri to found Neri-Verbanac Public Affairs, a Harrisburg-based public affairs agency. There, he helped develop The Insider, which became the "largest statewide political publication." The firm was sold in 2005 and Verbanac and Neri parted ways.

In 2005, Verbanac served as a director of the real estate arm of Summa Group, a financial company dealing with service and technology companies. In 2007, Joseph B. Scarnati, President pro tempore of the Pennsylvania Senate, named Verbanac as trustee of his alma mater, University of Pittsburgh.

Verbanac's relationship with Pittsburgh Mayor Luke Ravenstahl became a campaign issue in the 2009 Pittsburgh mayoral election. In 2010, Politics Magazine named him one of the most influential Democrats in Pennsylvania, even though Verbanac is a registered Republican according to Butler County voter registration records.
