= United Football League =

United Football League may refer to:

- United Football League (Philippines), an association football league in the Philippines
- United Football League (1961–1964), an American football league which operated from 1961 to 1964
- United Football League (2009–2012), an American football league which operated from 2009 to 2012
- United Football League (2024–present), an American football league which started play in 2024

== See also ==
- United League (football), a British association football league
- United Indoor Football League
- United States Football League
- United States Football League (disambiguation)
- United League (disambiguation)
- UFL (disambiguation)
