= Mike Long (lobbyist) =

American lobbyist

- Occupations: Lobbyist, strategist
- Known for: Political operative
- Political party: Republican

Mike Long is an American lobbyist, political strategist, and former legislative aide in Pennsylvania.

== Career ==
He was chief of staff for President Pro Tempore of the Pennsylvania Senate Robert Jubelirer. He is also the brother-in-law of former majority leader, David (Chip) Brightbill. He also was the "chief political strategist" for the Senate Republican Caucus. Mike Long is generally credited for keeping the Republican caucus in the majority, which held a 30-20 advantage at its peak. The political newsletter The Insider called him the "Jubelirer-Brightbill Political Brain" and praised his ability to identify Democratic senate seats that could be flipped for the GOP.

He left the Senate after 27 years after the 2006 Republican primary. He then became a lobbyist, representing, among others, the Pennsylvania Turnpike Commission.

== Awards and recognition ==
PoliticsPA named him the top political operative in Pennsylvania, saying that his masterminding of Joseph B. Scarnati's independent campaign against Bill Slocum "was one for the books." He was also named the PoliticsPA "Republican Dream Team" of campaign operatives. The Pennsylvania Report named him to the 2003 "The Pennsylvania Report Power 75" list of influential figures in Pennsylvania politics, calling him "Pennsylvania’s best “in-house” political operative by a mile." He was named to the PoliticsPA list of "Sy Snyder's Power 50" in 2002 and 2003. In 2009, the Pennsylvania Report named him to "The Pennsylvania Report 100" list of influential figures in Pennsylvania politics, noting that he "remains a force in PA politics due to inside connections to Senate leaders and his institutional knowledge of legislative procedures" and that he remains close with current President Pro Tempore of the Pennsylvania Senate Joe Scarnati. He was named to the PoliticsPA list of "Pennsylvania's Smartest Staffers and Operatives."
