= Azteca Fight League =

Mixed martial arts promotion company

- Company type: Private
- Industry: Mixed martial arts promotion
- Founded: 2019; 7 years ago
- Headquarters: Monterrey, Nuevo León, Mexico

Azteca Fight League is a Mexican mixed martial arts promotion based in Monterrey, Nuevo León.

== History ==
Azteca Fight League was founded in 2019 with the goal of improving and shaping combat sports in the northeastern region of Mexico. AFL held its inaugural event, AFL 1, on December 13 of that year in Monterrey.

In August 2025, AFL resumed its activities after more than a year's hiatus with the announcement of AFL 11 at Salón Ribera.

== List of events ==
#	Event	Date	Venue	Location
12	AFL 12	March 13, 2026	Salón Ribera	Monterrey, Mexico
11	AFL 11	August 9, 2025	Salón Ribera	Monterrey, Mexico
10	AFL 10	August 25, 2023	Cintermex	Monterrey, Mexico
9	AFL 9	August 12, 2022	Cintermex	Monterrey, Mexico
8	AFL 8	April 1, 2022	Cintermex	Monterrey, Mexico
7	AFL 7	December 3, 2021	Auditorio DIMO	Aguascalientes, Mexico
6	AFL 6	August 27, 2021	Circulo Mercantil Mutualista	Monterrey, Mexico
5	AFL 5	April 9, 2021	Circulo Mercantil Mutualista	Monterrey, Mexico
4	AFL 4	February 21, 2021	Circulo Mercantil Mutualista	Monterrey, Mexico
3	AFL 3	December 12, 2020	Circulo Mercantil Mutualista	Monterrey, Mexico
2	AFL 2	October 22, 2020	Circulo Mercantil Mutualista	Monterrey, Mexico
1	AFL 1	December 13, 2019	Circulo Mercantil Mutualista	Monterrey, Mexico
