= Fox college bowl game broadcasts =

Initial college football broadcasts on the Fox network were limited to selected bowl games, beginning with the Cotton Bowl Classic from 1999 to 2014. From 2006 to 2009, Fox broadcast the Bowl Championship Series (excluding games played at the Rose Bowl stadium, whose rights were held by ABC under a separate agreement). Fox also holds rights to the Redbox Bowl and Holiday Bowl.

== Coverage history ==
=== Cotton Bowl Classic ===
The Fox network acquired its first college football telecast in 1998, when it obtained the broadcast rights to the annual Cotton Bowl Classic held each January on (eventually, the day after) New Year's Day; the first game to be shown on the network as part of the deal was held on January 1, 1999. Fox renewed its contract to carry the game in 2010, in a four-year agreement that ran through the 2013 NCAA college football season.

Fox lost the rights to the Cotton Bowl to ESPN for the 2015 edition, as the cable network holds the television contract to all six bowl games that encompass the College Football Playoff system under a twelve-year deal worth over $7.3 billion. The Cotton Bowl was the only game among the six that was not already broadcast by ESPN.

Date	Network	Play-by-play	Color commentator(s)	Sideline reporter(s)
January 3, 2014	Fox	Gus Johnson	Charles Davis	Kristina Pink
January 4, 2013	Fox	Gus Johnson	Charles Davis	Julie Alexandria and Petros Papadakis
January 6, 2012	Fox	Gus Johnson	Charles Davis	Tim Brewster and Daryl Johnston
January 7, 2011	Fox	Kenny Albert	Daryl Johnston	Charles Davis and John Lynch
January 2, 2010	Fox	Pat Summerall	Daryl Johnston	Krista Voda and Shepard Smith
January 2, 2009	Fox	Pat Summerall	Brian Baldinger	Jeanne Zelasko and Krista Voda
January 1, 2008	Fox	Pat Summerall	Brian Baldinger	Jeanne Zelasko and Krista Voda
January 1, 2007	Fox	Pat Summerall	Brian Baldinger	Krista Voda
January 2, 2006	Fox	Thom Brennaman	Terry Donahue	Jeanne Zelasko and Chris Rix
January 1, 2005	Fox	Thom Brennaman	Brian Baldinger	Jeanne Zelasko
January 2, 2004	Fox	Thom Brennaman	Tim Green and Bill Maas	Brian Baldinger
January 1, 2003	Fox	Thom Brennaman	Tim Green and Ron Pitts	Brian Baldinger
January 1, 2002	Fox	Thom Brennaman	Tim Green and Dave Lapham	Brian Baldinger
January 1, 2001	Fox	Thom Brennaman	Tim Green and Dave Lapham	Brian Baldinger
January 1, 2000	Fox	Thom Brennaman	Tim Green and Dave Lapham	Mike Doocy
January 1, 1999	Fox	Joe Buck	Bill Maas	Suzy Kolber and Ron Pitts

=== Bowl Championship Series ===
From the 2006 through the 2009 seasons, Fox held the broadcast rights to most of the games comprising the Bowl Championship Series (BCS) – including the Sugar Bowl, the Fiesta Bowl and the Orange Bowl, as well as the BCS Championship Game. Fox paid close to $20 million per game for the rights to televise the BCS games. The network's contract with the BCS excluded any event in the series that was held at the Rose Bowl stadium, such as the Rose Bowl Game and the 2010 BCS National Championship Game, as ABC already had a separate arrangement with the Pasadena Tournament of Roses Association to serve as the broadcaster for the games.

ESPN, which is majority owned by ABC's corporate parent The Walt Disney Company and serves as the producer for all of ABC's sports coverage, would displace Fox outright as the broadcaster of the BCS beginning in the 2010–11 season. This left the Fox network with only the Cotton Bowl Classic as the sole college football game, to which it held the television rights until the 2013–14 season.

==== Fiesta Bowl ====
Date	Network	Play-by-play	Color commentator(s)	Sideline reporter(s)
January 4, 2010	Fox	Sam Rosen	Tim Ryan	Chris Myers
January 5, 2009	Fox	Matt Vasgersian	Tim Ryan	Chris Myers and Laura Okmin
January 2, 2008	Fox	Matt Vasgersian	Terry Donahue and Pat Haden	Laura Okmin
January 1, 2007	Fox	Thom Brennaman	Barry Alvarez and Charles Davis	Chris Myers

==== Orange Bowl ====
Date	Network	Play-by-play	Color commentator	Sideline reporters
January 5, 2010	Fox	Dick Stockton	Charles Davis	Chris Myers and Laura Okmin
January 1, 2009	Fox	Thom Brennaman	Charles Davis	Chris Myers
January 3, 2008	Fox	Kenny Albert	Daryl Johnston and Barry Alvarez	Jeanne Zelasko
January 2, 2007	Fox	Matt Vasgersian	Terry Donahue and Pat Haden	Laura Okmin

==== Sugar Bowl ====
Date	Network	Play-by-play	Color commentator(s)	Sideline reporter(s)
January 1, 2010	Fox	Thom Brennaman	Brian Billick	Chris Myers
January 2, 2009	Fox	Kenny Albert	Daryl Johnston	Chris Myers and Charissa Thompson
January 1, 2008	Fox	Thom Brennaman	Charles Davis	Chris Myers
January 3, 2007	Fox	Kenny Albert	Terry Bradshaw and Howie Long	Jeanne Zelasko

==== BCS National Championship Game ====
Year	Network(s)	Bowl	Play-by-play announcer	Color analyst(s)	Sideline reporter(s)	Studio host(s)	Studio analyst(s)	TV Rating
2007	Fox	2007 BCS National Championship Game	Thom Brennaman	Barry Alvarez and Charles Davis	Chris Myers	Chris Rose	Emmitt Smith, Eddie George and Jimmy Johnson	17.4
2008	Fox	2008 BCS National Championship Game	Thom Brennaman	Charles Davis	Chris Myers	Chris Rose	Eddie George, Urban Meyer and Jimmy Johnson	17.4
2009	Fox	2009 BCS National Championship Game	Thom Brennaman	Charles Davis	Chris Myers	Chris Rose	Eddie George, Barry Switzer and Jimmy Johnson	15.8

=== Holiday Bowl ===
The bowl has been broadcast by Mizlou (1978–1984), Lorimar (1985), ESPN (1986–2016), and Fox Sports 1 (2017–2019). On June 15, 2017, it was revealed that the Holiday Bowl had not renewed its contract with ESPN—one of the network's longest relationships—and had entered into an agreement to move to FS1 beginning 2017.

=== Redbox Bowl ===
From 2002 through 2015, the bowl was televised by ESPN or ESPN2; since 2016, it has been carried by Fox.

== See also ==
- CBS college bowl game broadcasts
- NBC college bowl game broadcasts
