= United League =

United League may refer:

== Sports ==
- United League Baseball, an independent baseball league, founded in 2006, which operated in Texas
- United Baseball League (proposed), a planned third North American baseball major league that folded without playing a game in 1996
- United League (football), a short-lived professional association football (soccer) league in England which existed during the late 19th century
- VTB United League, a basketball league

== Other uses ==
- United League (social organization), a U.S. African American organization in Mississippi
- United League, one of the English names for the revolutionary group Tongmenghui of China

== See also ==
- United Football League (disambiguation)
- UL (disambiguation)
