= Albert J. Neri =

- Born: September 1, 1952; Philadelphia
- Died: May 7, 2011 (aged 58); Harrisburg
- Education: Temple University
- Occupation: Journalist
- Notable credit: The Insider
- Spouse: Caroline Boyce
- Children: Daniel, Jeanette Quinlan, Emma Neri

Albert J. "Al" Neri (September 1, 1952 – May 7, 2011) was a Pennsylvania political news correspondent, pundit, and political analyst.

At the beginning of his career, Neri worked as a journalist following state and local government and politics for a variety of publications, including Erie Times-News, the Pittsburgh Post-Gazette, the Philadelphia Bulletin, the Philadelphia Business Journal, and the Bucks County Courier-Times. He has received a number of Keystone Press Awards, an award presented from the Pennsylvania Newspaper Association.

He was quoted on the subject of Pennsylvania politics in The New York Times, U.S. News & World Report, the Philadelphia Daily News and CNN. He has appeared as a guest on a variety of statewide news television programs, including the Journalists' Roundtable, the state-syndicated Newsmakers program, and live call-in shows on the Pennsylvania Cable Network. He is also a frequent guest lecturer on Pennsylvania politics to trade associations and political organizations.

During the 2000 presidential election, Pennsylvania Governor Tom Ridge was known to be under consideration as the running mate for Republican George W. Bush. Neri and fellow journalist Pete DeCoursey began planning a book about Ridge and contracted with an agent to pursue a book deal in the event that he was selected. After Ridge withdrew his name from consideration, both Neri and DeCoursey wrote columns blasting Ridge, since he had withdrawn his name from consideration three weeks before announcing it. Tim Reeves, Ridge's press secretary said that the situation was a "journalistic conflict of interest." Veteran Philadelphia Inquirer editor and journalism professor at Pennsylvania State University Gene Foreman agreed, noting that the book deal was not disclosed and that the two columns seemed "particularly personal" and contained "pretty extraordinary" language. In return, the editors of both newspapers that had carried the columns noted that they were aware of the book deal and took steps to remove any impropriety. The incident was covered in the American Journalism Review.

In 2001, Neri and political operative John Verbanac founded NeriVerbanac Public Affairs, a Harrisburg-based political and media consulting organization. The two also founded The Insider, a subscription-based newsletter reporting on Pennsylvania politics. Verbanac left the organization in 2005 and Neri continued with a new consulting firm, Envoi Communications. The firm counts corporations and non-profit institutions as clients.

Neri also worked as a consultant and columnist for GovNetPA, which hosts a searchable index of The Insider, and as managing director of Capitolwire after its purchase by GovNetPA.
