= United Soccer League (disambiguation) =

United Soccer League is an organizer of soccer leagues founded in 1985, which includes USL Championship, USL League One, and others.

United Soccer League may also refer to:

- USL First Division, a professional soccer league that operated from 2005 to 2009 that succeeded the A-League (1995–2004). Was replaced by the USSF Division 2 Professional League for the 2010 season.
- United Soccer League (1984–85), a professional soccer league founded in 1984 that folded at the end of the 1985 season
- USL Championship, a professional soccer league founded in 2010 known as United Soccer League from 2015 to 2018
