= Lynn Swann =

American football player and politician (born 1952)

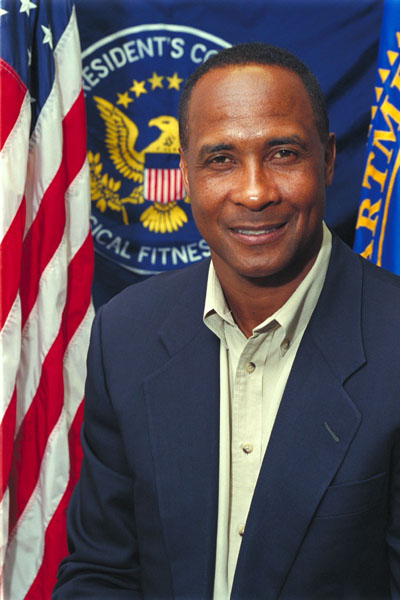
- Swann in 2005

No. 88
- Position: Wide receiver

Personal information
- Born: March 7, 1952 (age 74); Alcoa, Tennessee, U.S.
- Listed height: 5 ft 11 in (1.80 m)
- Listed weight: 180 lb (82 kg)

Career information
- High school: Junípero Serra (San Mateo, California)
- College: USC (1970–1973)
- NFL draft: 1974: 1st round, 21st overall pick

Career history

Playing
- Pittsburgh Steelers (1974–1982)

Operations
- Pittsburgh Power (2011–2014) Co-owner; USC (2016–2019) Athletic director

Awards and highlights
- 4× Super Bowl champion (IX, X, XIII, XIV); Super Bowl MVP (X); NFL Man of the Year (1981); 3× First-team All-Pro (1975, 1977, 1978); 3× Pro Bowl (1975, 1977, 1978); NFL receiving touchdowns co-leader (1975); NFL 1970s All-Decade Team; PFWA NFL All-Rookie Team (1974); Pittsburgh Steelers All-Time Team; Pittsburgh Steelers Hall of Honor; National champion (1972); Consensus All-American (1973); Pop Warner Trophy (1973); First-team All-Pac-8 (1973)

Career NFL statistics
- Receptions: 336
- Receiving yards: 5,462
- Receiving touchdowns: 51
- Stats at Pro Football Reference
- Pro Football Hall of Fame
- College Football Hall of Fame

Lynn Curtis Swann (born March 7, 1952) is an American former professional football player, broadcaster, politician, and athletic director, best known for his association with the University of Southern California and the Pittsburgh Steelers. He served on the President's Council on Fitness, Sports, and Nutrition from 2002 to 2005. In 2006, he was the Republican nominee for Governor of Pennsylvania.

Swann was born in Alcoa, Tennessee. He attended USC and played football as a wide receiver of the USC Trojans, where he was a consensus All-American. He is regarded as one of the most popular and one of the greatest wide receivers of his generation. He was selected by the Steelers in the first round of the 1974 NFL draft. With the Steelers, Swann won four Super Bowls, was selected to three Pro Bowls, and was named MVP of Super Bowl X. Swann was inducted into the Pro Football Hall of Fame in 2001 and the College Football Hall of Fame in 1993.

== Early life ==
Swann was born March 7, 1952, in Alcoa, Tennessee, in the foothills of the Great Smoky Mountains near Knoxville.

The Swann family moved to San Mateo, California, in the San Francisco Bay Area when Lynn was 2. As a youth, Swann was raised in neighboring Foster City and attended Junípero Serra High School, where in addition to playing football, he was a track star, leaping 24 ft 10 in (7.57 m) in the long jump. Swann had also joined the basketball team and had an interest in ballet. His basketball teammate, Peter Barsocchini was aware of Swann's passion for ballet, which inspired him to write the High School Musical film, with Swann serving as an inspiration for the character of Troy Bolton.

At the 1970 CIF California State championship meet, Swann won the state title, defeating future Olympic gold medalist Randy Williams.

== College career ==
Swann attended the University of Southern California in Los Angeles, where he was a consensus All-American on the Trojan football team under head coach John McKay, including the undefeated and national champion 1972 team. McKay said of Swann, "He has speed, soft hands, and grace." He completed a Bachelor of Arts Degree in public relations in 1974.

In 1971, Swann had 27 catches for 305 yards and two touchdowns. He led USC in catches and finished second to WR Edesel Garrison in receiving yards. As a junior in 1972, Swann rushed for 117 yards and had 27 catches for 543 yards and three touchdowns. This time, he led USC in receiving yards and finished second to tight end Charle Young in catches. In 1973, Swann rushed for 99 yards while catching 42 passes for 714 yards and six touchdowns.

== Professional career ==
Swann was selected in the first round of the 1974 NFL draft by the Pittsburgh Steelers with the 21st overall pick. The Steelers draft class of '74 is considered one of the best in NFL history and includes four Hall of Famers: Swann, Jack Lambert (RD2), John Stallworth (RD4), and Mike Webster (RD5). Undrafted 1974 free agent signee Donnie Shell is also a hall of famer.

Swann spent his entire NFL career with the Steelers and wore the jersey number 88. As a rookie in 1974, he led the NFL with 577 punt-return yards, a franchise record and the fourth-most in NFL history at the time. He was named to the PFWA All-Rookie Team. He went on to win a championship ring with the Steelers in Super Bowl IX, but did not record any receptions in the tough defensive struggle (Pittsburgh quarterback Terry Bradshaw completed only nine passes in the game). However, he returned three punts for 34 yards.

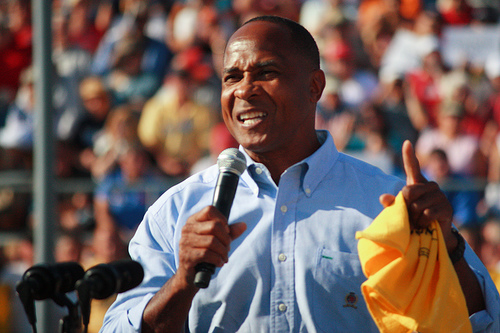
Swann waves the Terrible Towel

The following season became the highlight of Swann's career. He caught 49 passes for 781 yards and a league-leading 11 touchdowns. In the AFC title game against the Oakland Raiders, George Atkinson knocked Swann out of the game with a very hard but legal hit. He suffered a severe concussion that forced him to spend two days in a hospital, but surprised many by returning to play for Super Bowl X. Swann recorded four catches for a Super Bowl-record 161 yards and a touchdown in the game, assisting the Steelers to a 21–17 win over the Dallas Cowboys and became the first wide receiver to earn Super Bowl MVP honors.

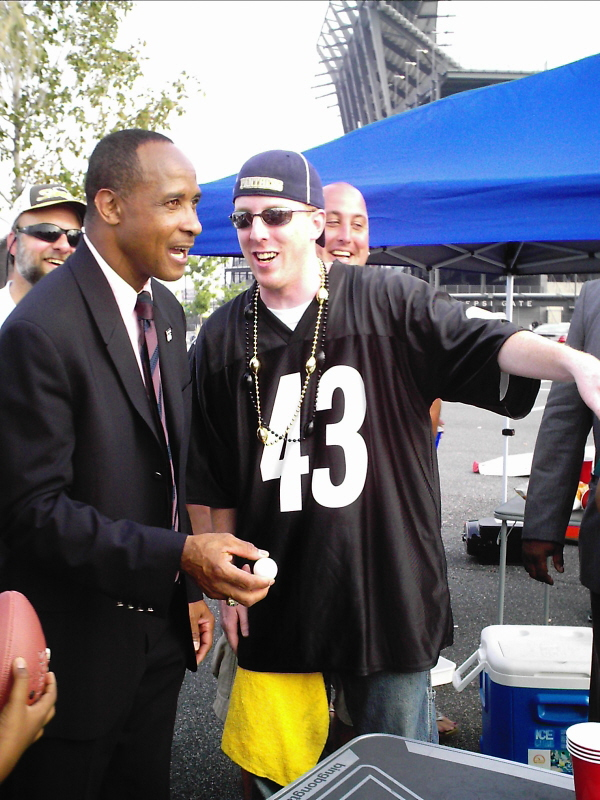
Swann with Steelers fans before a game in 2006

Three seasons later, in 1978, the Steelers made it to Super Bowl XIII. In the game, Swann caught seven passes for 124 yards and scored the final touchdown for Pittsburgh in their 35–31 win over Dallas.

The Steelers made it back to the Super Bowl again in the 1979 season, and Swann caught five passes for 79 yards and a touchdown at the Rose Bowl in Pittsburgh's 31–19 win over the Los Angeles Rams in Super Bowl XIV. Overall, Swann gained 364 receiving yards and 398 all-purpose yards in his four Super Bowls, which were both Super Bowl records at the time.

Swann retired after the 1982 season with four Super Bowl rings. In his nine-year career, he amassed 336 career receptions for 5,462 yards and 51 touchdowns, 72 rushing yards on 11 attempts and a touchdown, and 739 punt return yards and a touchdown. He was a Pro Bowl selection three times (1975, 1977, 1978), and was selected to the 1970s All-Decade Team.

Swann was unique among football players in that he credited his experiences in dance earlier in life with contributing to his aptitude on the football field. A 1981 interview which aired on Mr. Rogers' Neighborhood showed him on the field, and then in the Pittsburgh dance studio where he later underwrote scholarships.

Swann was named to the All-Pro team in 1975, 1977, and 1978, and was elected to the Pro Football Hall of Fame in 2001, a year before his teammate John Stallworth.

=== NFL statistics ===
Legend
	Won the Super Bowl
	Super Bowl MVP
**Bold**	Career high

Year	Team	GP	Rec	Yards	Avg	TD
1974	PIT	12	11	208	18.9	2
1975	PIT	14	49	781	15.9	**11**
1976	PIT	12	28	516	18.4	3
1977	PIT	14	50	789	15.8	7
1978	PIT	16	**61**	**880**	14.4	11
1979	PIT	13	41	808	**19.7**	5
1980	PIT	13	44	710	16.1	7
1981	PIT	13	34	505	14.9	5
1982	PIT	9	18	265	14.7	0
Career		116	336	5,462	16.3	51

== After football ==
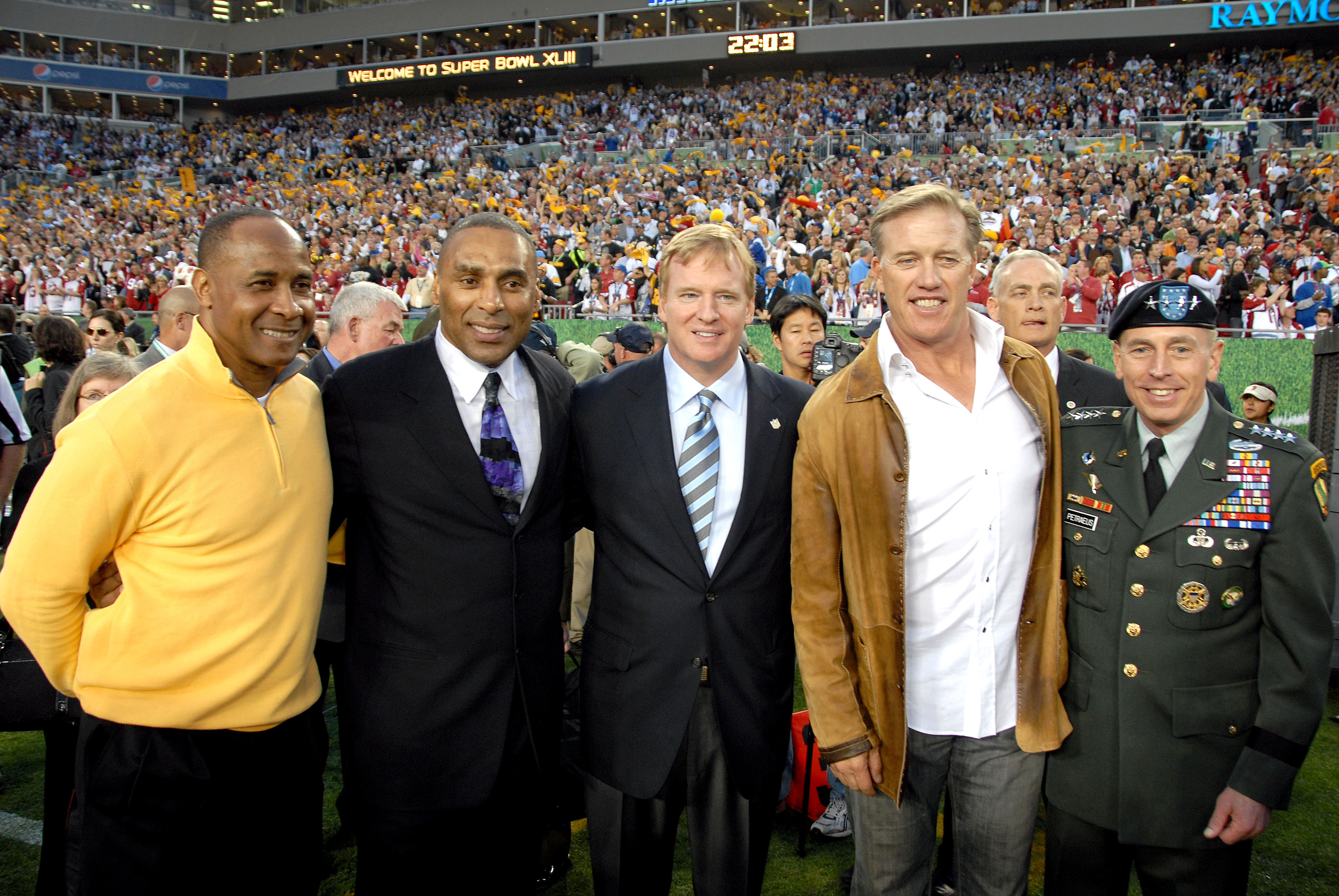
Swann (far left) at Super Bowl XLIII with Roger Craig, Roger Goodell, John Elway, and General David Petraeus

Swann went on to serve as a director on the boards of H J Heinz Co., Hershey Entertainment and Resorts, and Wyndham International. He was a football and sports broadcaster for ABC Sports from 1976 to 2006, but left to run for Pennsylvania governor.

Swann briefly hosted the television game show To Tell the Truth, on which he had previously appeared as a panelist before replacing original host Gordon Elliott, on NBC from 1990 to 1991. His 14-week run as emcee ended, and he was replaced by Alex Trebek. He made guest appearances on Mister Rogers' Neighborhood, where he explained his enthusiasm for ballet, and The Paper Chase.

During his time at ABC, Lynn Swann began his broadcasting career in 1976 while still active with the Pittsburgh Steelers. Upon retirement in January 1983, Swann began his career full-time with ABC Sports, which ended after the 2006 Sugar Bowl. Swann has broadcast a variety of events as a host, reporter, and analyst. Included in these events are:

- the 1976 Winter Olympics
- the 1976 Summer Olympics
- the 1980 Winter Olympics
- the 1984 Winter Olympics
- the 1984 Summer Olympics
- the 1988 Winter Olympics
- the Iditarod Trail sled dog race
- International Diving Championships
- USFL
- college football
- Monday Night Football
- the Kentucky Derby
- Preakness Stakes
- Belmont Stakes
- the Irish Derby
- ABC's Wide World of Sports
- Curt Gowdy's The American Sportsman

Swann was the sideline reporter on CBS' "Clash of Champions" bowling telecast that aired on May 10–11, 2008. He teamed with color analyst Nelson Burton Jr. and play-by-play man Bill Macatee. The broadcast marked bowling's return to network television for the first time since 1999 when CBS carried it.

In October 2009, Swann joined the Augusta National Golf Club. He is a dues-paying member of the home of the Masters golf tournament, which is held every April.

On August 19, 2010, the Pittsburgh Tribune-Review reported that Swann would be a part of the ownership team for Pittsburgh's AFL expansion franchise, which began playing in the spring of 2011. Named the Pittsburgh Power, the team shared the Consol Energy Center with the Pittsburgh Penguins of the National Hockey League. Swann has said that, despite his football experience, he does not interfere in the day-to-day coaching, although he would occasionally give some advice. The team folded in 2014.

Swann made an appearance, playing himself, in the role of a sideline reporter at the "Bourbon Bowl", in the 1998 Adam Sandler comedy feature film The Waterboy. He was inducted into the Rose Bowl Hall of Fame on December 30, 2013, at the Pasadena Convention Center.

On April 13, 2016, Swann was named as the athletic director of the University of Southern California, succeeding retiring Pat Haden. He assumed the position on July 1, 2016. On September 9, 2019, Swann resigned as the USC AD.

== Political career ==
=== Physical Fitness and Sports Council chairman ===
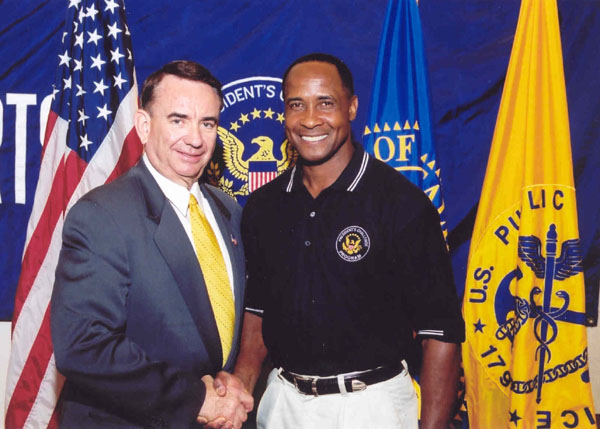
Lynn Swann and HHS Secretary Tommy Thompson

(video) Lynn Swann introducing a video for NASA as part of the President's Council on Physical Fitness and Sports

On June 20, 2002, President George W. Bush appointed Swann as the chairman of the United States President's Council on Physical Fitness and Sports during a Fitness Expo at the White House. Swann succeeded Lee Haney, who had been appointed to the post by President Clinton.

In 2003, President Bush and Chairman Lynn Swann launched presidentschallenge.org at the Lakewest Family YMCA in Dallas, Texas. Within the next year, 300,000 individuals registered on the website. Swann spoke at the National Press Club about the council's programs to help Americans "Be Physically Active Every Day," and introduced the Presidential Active Lifestyle Award.

In 2004, Swann and President Bush declared May as an annual "National Physical Fitness and Sports" month, and created the annual HealthierUS Fitness Festival. They also enacted the Healthier Feds Physical Activity Challenge initiative for federal employees. On July 30, 2005, Lynn Swann retired as council chairman to explore a campaign for governor. He was succeeded by John P. Burke.

=== 2006 candidacy for governor ===
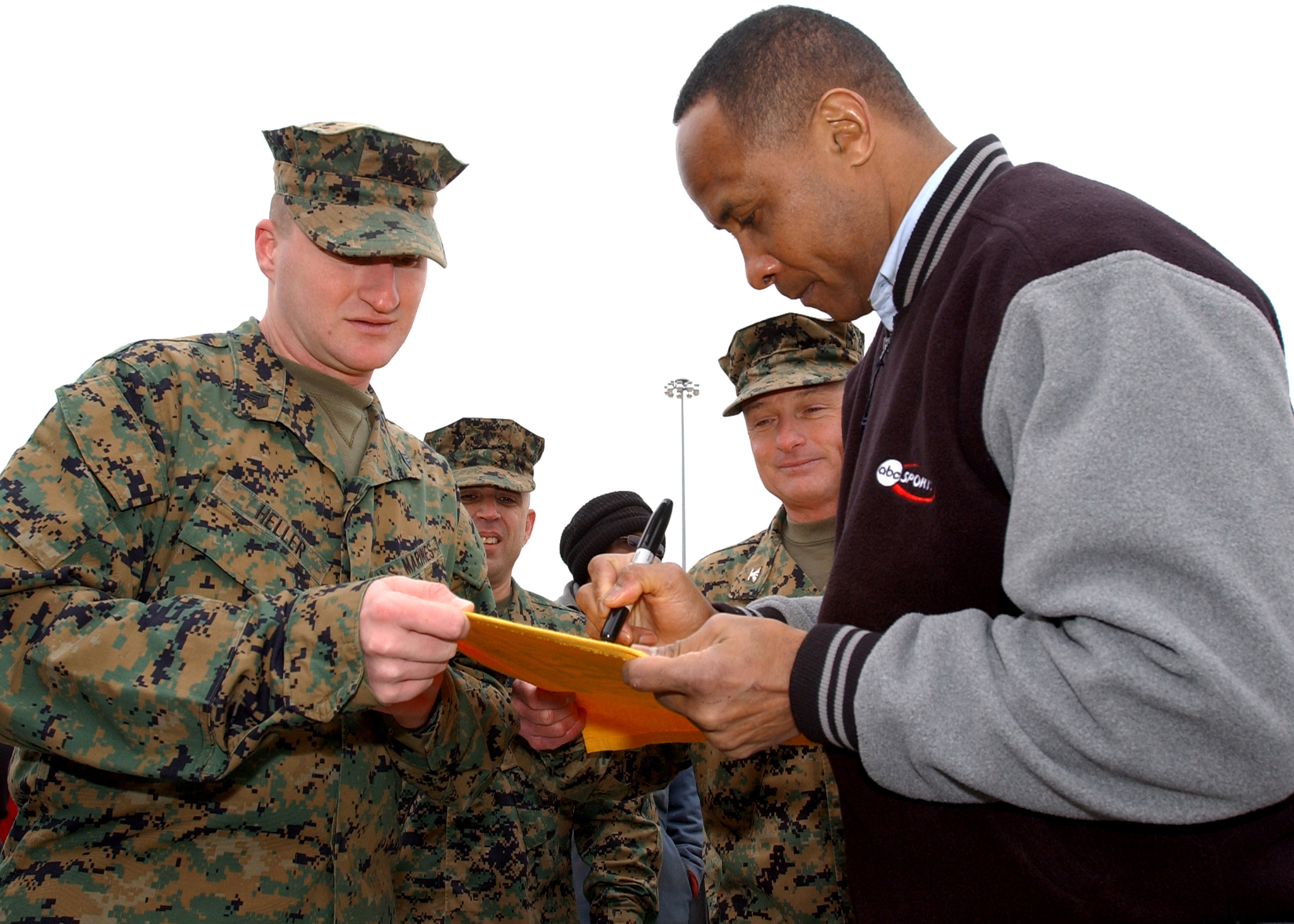
Swann (right) signing an autograph for Marine Corps Sgt. Charles Heller

In December 2004, Swann, who resides in the Pittsburgh suburb of Sewickley Heights, Pennsylvania, indicated that he was considering seeking the Republican nomination for Governor of Pennsylvania in the 2006 election. On February 23, 2005, Swann filed papers with the state elections board stating his intention to run. On the same day, he formed a fundraising committee called Team 88 after his Steeler jersey number. On January 4, 2006, Swann formally declared his candidacy.

Swann's opponents for the Republican primary had initially included Jim Panyard, State Senator Jeff Piccola and former Lieutenant Governor William Scranton, III. After Swann received the endorsement of the Republican state committee on February 11, all three opponents quit the race, leaving Swann as the only Republican to have filed by the deadline of March 7. Swann chose Montgomery County Commissioner Jim Matthews as his running mate.

Polls in early February showed Swann and Ed Rendell in a statistical tie, though Rendell had the advantage of being the popular incumbent. Swann's campaign focused on reforming Harrisburg by addressing mass transit, property tax, law enforcement, the environment and the growing concern of obesity. He also supported giving the Pittsburgh Penguins Pittsburgh's lone slots license so they could build a new arena, free of taxpayer money.

Swann's momentum did not survive a barrage of advertising from Rendell in early spring, and had trouble keeping up with Rendell's effective fundraising. In the end, Swann lost the election with 40% of the vote to Rendell's 60%. Had Swann won, he would have been the first African American Governor of Pennsylvania and only the third African American elected governor of a state in U.S. history. Of the three Republican African American gubernatorial candidates in 2006, all three of them lost; Kenneth Blackwell lost in Ohio, and Randy Daniels lost in New York.

=== 2008 to present ===
In 2008, Swann confirmed that he was considering running for the United States House of Representatives from Pennsylvania's 4th congressional district against Rep. Jason Altmire. However, Swann did not file for the election and former congresswoman Melissa Hart won the Republican nomination unopposed and then lost to Altmire in the 2008 general election.

In the 2008 presidential election, Swann endorsed and campaigned with Arizona Senator John McCain for the presidency, though Swann had remained neutral through the primaries. In 2012, he did the same for former Massachusetts Governor Mitt Romney, once Romney had become the presumptive Republican nominee.

In 2015, before the primary elections, Swann announced his support of former Florida Governor Jeb Bush, while also criticizing Donald Trump.

== Personal life ==
On June 10, 1979, during the summer after winning Super Bowl XIII, Swann married Bernadette Robi, the daughter of singer Paul Robi of The Platters. The pair divorced in 1983.

On June 23, 1991, Swann married Charena (née Shaffer), a psychologist, and they have two sons who played football collegiately.

== See also ==
- Bay Area Sports Hall of Fame
- Drew Crompton

Media offices
Preceded by Gordon Elliott	Host of To Tell the Truth; 1990–1991	Succeeded by Alex Trebek
Political offices
Preceded by Lee Haney	Chair of the President's Council on Physical Fitness and Sports; 2002–2005	Succeeded by John Burke
Party political offices
Preceded by Mike Fisher	Republican nominee for Governor of Pennsylvania; 2006	Succeeded by Tom Corbett
