= Israel González (basketball) =

Spanish basketball coach

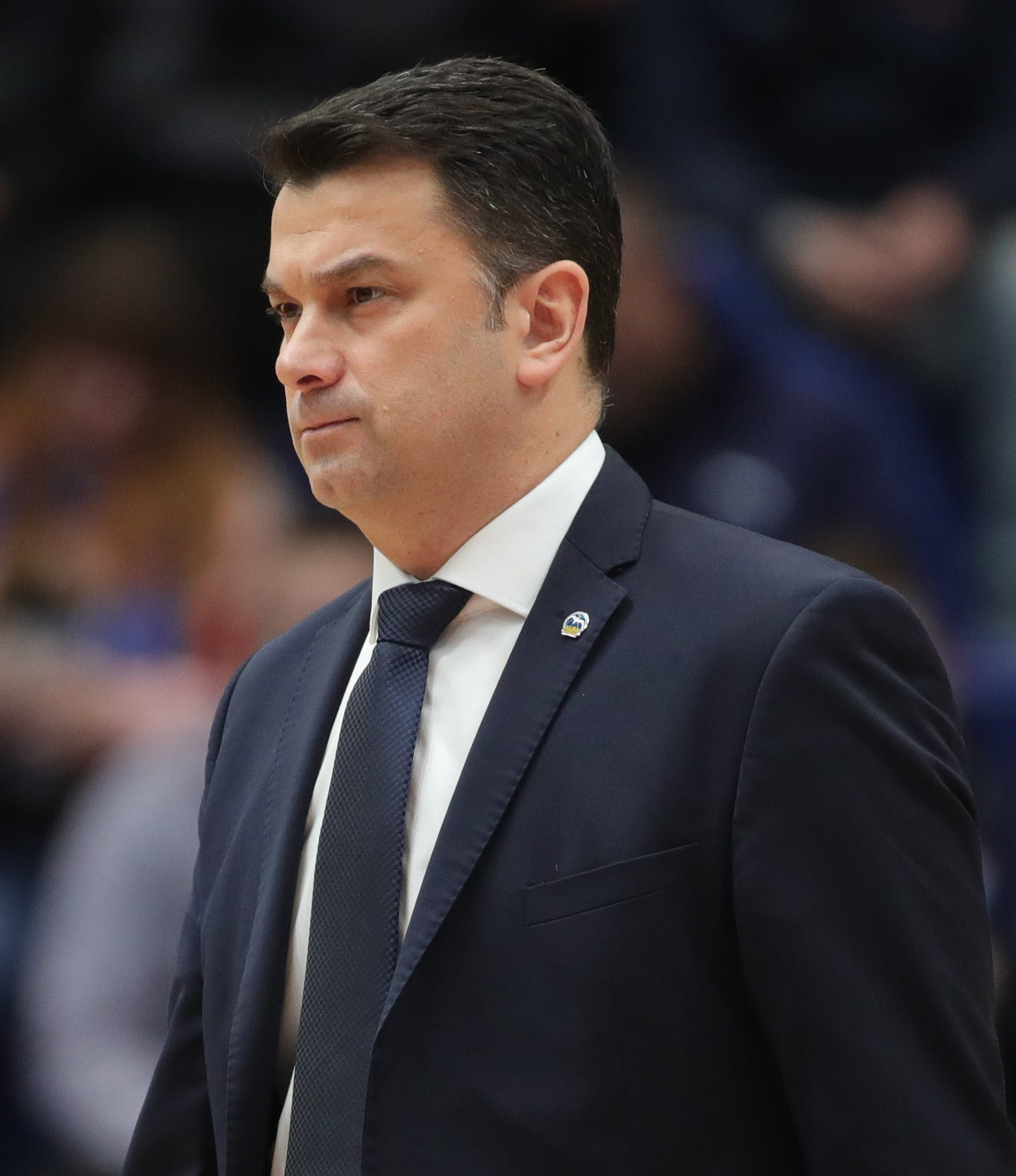
- González in 2023

Valencia Basket
- Position: Assistant coach
- League: Liga ACB

Personal information
- Born: February 16, 1975 (age 51) Torrelavega, Spain
- Coaching career: 2004–present

Career history

Coaching
- 2004–2008: Cantabria Baloncesto (assistant)
- 2009–2017: CB Gran Canaria (assistant)
- 2017–2021: Alba Berlin (assistant)
- 2021–2025: Alba Berlin
- 2025–2026: Pallacanestro Trieste
- 2026–present: Valencia Basket (assistant)

Career highlights
- As head coach: German League champion (2021–2022); German Cup winner (2022); As assistant coach: 2× German League champion (2020–2021); German Cup winner (2020)

Israel Joaquín González Nuñez (born 16 February 1975) is a Spanish professional basketball coach, currently serving as an assistant under Xavi Albert at Valencia Basket of the Liga ACB. Prior to this, he worked as head coach for Pallacanestro Trieste of the Italian Lega Basket Serie A (LBA), and Alba Berlin of the Basketball Bundesliga.

== Coaching career ==
In 2017, González signed with Alba Berlin to become an assistant coach under head coach, Aíto García Reneses. He helped the team to capture its first German League title since 2009, and their first German Cup since 2016. González was sacked by Alba Berlin on March 12, 2025. He paid the price for the team's disappointing performances during the 2024–25 season. Berlin was sitting in 12th place in the Bundesliga standings and in last place in EuroLeague play, when González was dismissed.

== Personal life ==
He graduated with a physical education degree from the Facultad de Ciencias de la actividad Física y Deporte.
