= Cintermex =

Indoor arena in Monterrey, Nuevo León, Mexico

Coordinates: 25.6782°N 100.2881°W

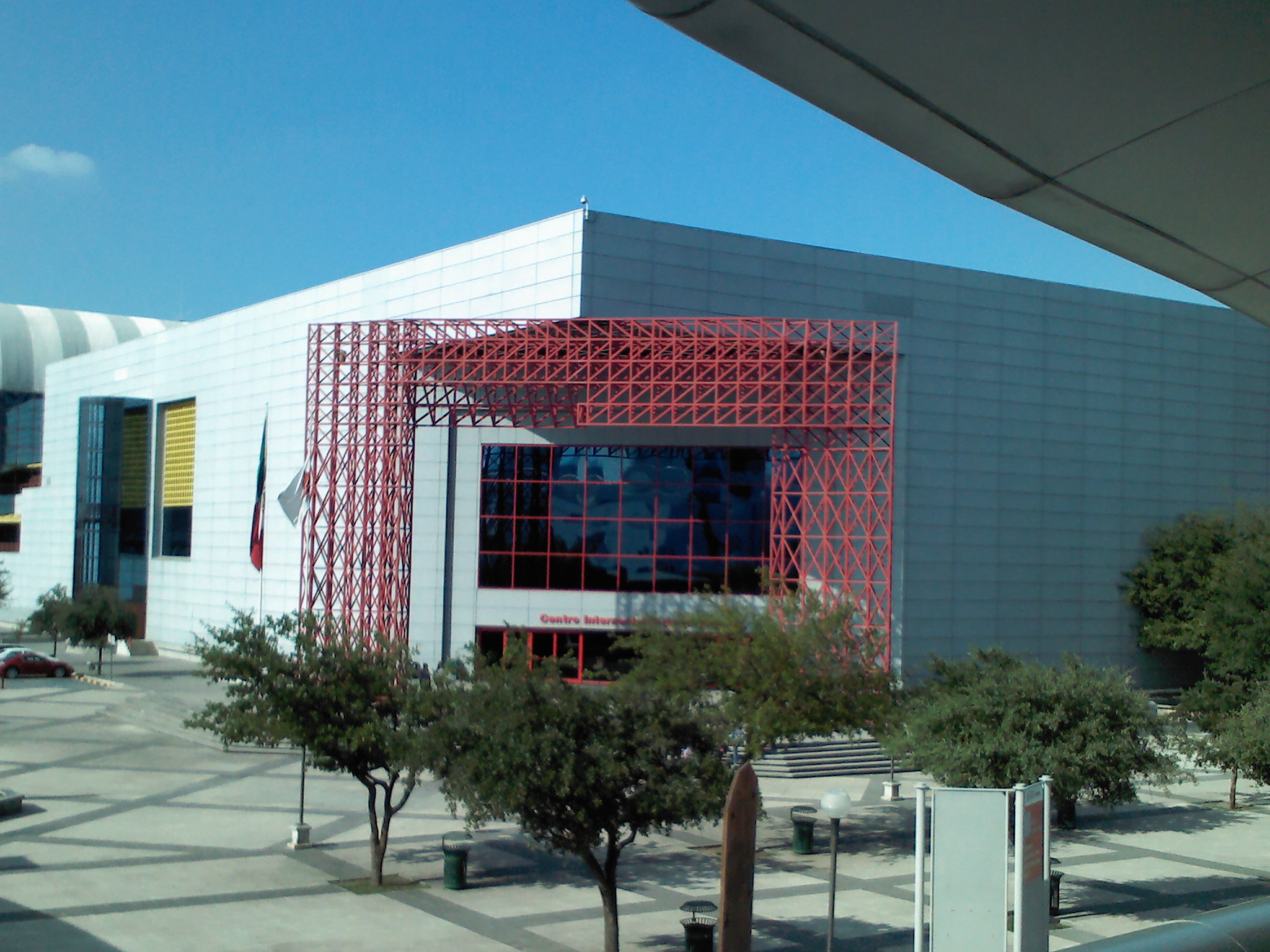
- Interactive map of Cintermex
- Location: Av Fundidora 501, Obrera, 64010; Monterrey, Nuevo León, Mexico
- Capacity: 4,700

Construction
- Opened: April 25, 1991

The Centro Internacional de Negocios Monterrey ("Monterrey International Business Center"), known as Cintermex (sometimes stylized in all caps), is an exhibition center and convention center located in Monterrey, Nuevo León, Mexico. The venue dedicated to hosting exhibitions, congresses, business, social, and entertainment events.

Located in Fundidora Park, Cintermex was inaugurated on April 25, 1991.

== Infrastructure ==
Cintermex has the infrastructure to host 140 events a year, attracting approximately four million attendees.

- Capacity: Up to 4,700 seated guests.
- Parking: 2,000 spaces owned by the venue, and approximately 5,000 additional spaces available.
