= United States Football League on television =

On May 24, 1982, the United States Football League (USFL) reached an agreement with ABC and ESPN on television rights. The money for inaugural 1983 season would be a total of $13 million: $9 million from ABC and $4 million from ESPN (roughly $1.1 million per team).

== Coverage overview ==
ABC televised a Sunday afternoon game-of-the-week, one prime time evening game, plus coverage of the USFL divisional playoffs and championship game. The contract required the USFL to schedule a minimum of three games on Sunday, with ABC guaranteed to broadcast one game nationally (the aforementioned, Sunday afternoon game-of-the-week) or two or more regionally. The contract included no clauses regarding "blackouts" or "cross-feeding". In all, the total package with ABC called for 21 telecasts of USFL action. Meanwhile, ESPN generally televised two prime time games (on Saturdays and Mondays respectively) each week of the USFL season.

=== The first USFL games on ABC and ESPN ===
On Sunday, March 6, 1983, ABC televised three games. The Los Angeles Express and New Jersey Generals played in the primary regional televised USFL game, with the Express winning, 20–15. ABC also televised the Chicago Blitz at Washington Federals and the Philadelphia Stars at Denver Gold.

On Monday, March 7, 1983, the Michigan Panthers opened their 1983 schedule with a 9–7 win at Legion Field in Birmingham, Alabama against the Stallons. The game marked the first professional football game ever to be broadcast on ESPN. Novo Bojovic of Serbia hit the winning field goal from 48 yards out in the waning moments to preserve the Panthers' road win.

=== Sponsors ===
ABC claimed to have made a profit from its coverage of USFL during the 1983 season. Regular season 30-second spots were priced at $30,000; playoff spots at $35,000. Thirty-second spots for the championship game between the Michigan Panthers and the Philadelphia Stars played on July 17 sold for $60,000. Major sponsors throughout the season included Gallo, Anheuser Busch, Buick, Chevrolet, Dodge, Honda and Miller.

Major USFL sponsors for ESPN in 1984 included Ford, Anheuser Busch, American Motors, DuPont, GMC, Mattel, Michelin, Nissan, Noxema, Timex and A.C. Delco.

=== Ratings ===
According to an ABC spokesman, the network averaged a 6.0 rating for their first USFL season. This was slightly better than the network's coverage of the first American Football League football season back in 1960. In its second year, AFL games on ABC averaged a 6.1 rating, and in 1962, the third year, a 6.5. The coverage was nonetheless quite low for a Big Three television network, with a June 17 prime-time regular season game between Chicago and Birmingham finishing as the lowest-rated prime time broadcast of the week, with a 4.8 rating.

Overall, ESPN averaged a 3.3 rating for its USFL coverage, a 3.0 for Saturday games and a 3.5 for the Monday night coverage. "We are pretty pleased with the results", said an ESPN spokesman, who noted that the network's overall USFL rating average was almost 50% higher than its prime time average for their entire fourth quarter of 1982.

=== The end of the USFL itself ===
ABC offered the USFL a 4-year, $175 million TV deal to play in the spring in 1986. ESPN offered $70M over 3 years, regardless of the time of year. By this point, the league had driven out most of the owners who would have been willing to accept those terms. The owners in the league walked away from what averaged out to $67 million per year starting in 1986 to pursue their big picture—merger with the NFL.

In 1984, the league began discussing the possibility of competing head-to-head with the NFL by playing its games in the fall beginning in 1986. The idea was to force a merger in which the NFL would be forced to admit some USFL teams. Despite the protests of many of the league's "old guard," who wanted to stay with the original plan of playing football in the spring months, the voices of incoming Chicago owner Eddie Einhorn (who would never field his team in the league and did not even plan on doing so in 1986) and Generals owner Donald Trump and others would eventually prevail. Trump sold a majority of the other owners on the gamble that if a merger did occur, their teams would instantly be worth the $70 million or so NFL franchises were worth at that time --- tripling, quadrupling, or more their cash investment.

On August 22, 1984, the league's owners voted to go along with Einhorn and Trump's idea and begin playing a fall season in 1986. The fourteen remaining owners reiterated this intention in a second vote on April 30, 1985. The spring advocates had lost and the fall advocates would accept nothing less than victory vs. the NFL, either by forcing a merger or winning a sizeable settlement and securing a TV network for fall broadcasts. Spring football had been replaced with an incredibly risky gamble for a huge return. The spring football advocates promptly threatened to leave the league (among them the Pittsburgh Maulers, who immediately folded, the Tampa Bay Bandits, who intended to continue in the spring without the USFL, and the Denver Gold, who were considering joining the Bandits but had not yet made a firm commitment). The illness and death of the Bandits' owner derailed the efforts to maintain a presence of professional football in the spring. Others that were sharing markets with the NFL (such as the New Orleans Breakers and Philadelphia Stars) were forced to relocate, which combined with the smaller markets that had received USFL teams in 1984 but had no other major league franchises at the time (Jacksonville, Birmingham, Memphis and Oklahoma) undermined the league's contention that it was a major league and discouraged the major networks from carrying their games.

The other major factor in the networks' lack of interest in the USFL was the College Football Association. The CFA had successfully sued the NCAA in the lawsuit NCAA v. Board of Regents of the University of Oklahoma, gaining control of its member colleges' television rights. Whereas the NCAA handed its exclusive rights to one network (CBS in 1983), the CFA offered packages to both CBS and ABC, and ABC also acquired rights to the Pacific-10 and Big Ten Conferences. With ABC now once again having college football to air on Saturdays, and the network reluctant to give up weeknight prime time, they no longer needed the USFL.

In another effort to keep themselves afloat while at the same time attacking the more established National Football League, the USFL filed an antitrust lawsuit against the older league, claiming it had established a monopoly with respect to television broadcasting rights, and in some cases, to access of stadium venues.

The USFL claimed that the NFL had bullied ABC, CBS and NBC into not televising USFL games in the fall. It also claimed that the NFL had a specific plan to eliminate the USFL, the "Porter Presentation." In particular, the USFL claimed the NFL conspired to ruin the Invaders and Generals. The USFL sought damages of $567 million, which would have been tripled to $1.7 billion under antitrust law. It hoped to void the NFL's contracts with the three major networks. The USFL proposed two remedies: either force the NFL to negotiate new television contracts with only two networks, or force the NFL to split into two competing 14-team leagues, each limited to a contract with one major network.

Lack of an over-the-air broadcast partner aside, ESPN still offered to carry 22 USFL games on its channel for the fall 1986 season: a game of the week on Sunday nights, three playoff games and the championship. ESPN's contract had an escape clause that would have allowed the network to cancel its contract with the league if membership dropped below 12 active teams (only eight teams were scheduled to play that year), but ESPN chose not to exercise the clause in 1986. In 1987, ESPN gave this time slot to the NFL, establishing that league's first cable presence and there introduced ESPN Sunday Night Football and the second primetime game of the week for the league each week.

== Franchises most affected by the television coverage ==
ABC's contract with the league required that, at the very least, there had to be franchises in the Chicago, Los Angeles, and New York markets. Not coincidentally, these markets were home to ABC's best-performing owned-and-operated stations--WLS-TV in Chicago, WABC-TV in New York and KABC-TV in Los Angeles.

=== Chicago Blitz ===
Before the end of the 1984 season, it was announced that the Blitz would be shut down. Chicago White Sox part-owner Eddie Einhorn was awarded a new Chicago franchise. While it was stressed that this new franchise was not the Blitz, Einhorn retained all player contracts. A strong proponent of the USFL's planned move to the fall in 1986, he opted not to field a team in 1985. ABC had no objections to this move, probably due to the USFL's anemic ratings in Chicago.

=== Denver Gold ===
Just after Mouse Davis took over as head coach, the USFL announced that it would switch to a fall schedule for the 1986 season. Local support for the Gold practically vanished. While the Gold had been one of the USFL's attendance leaders, fans in the Denver area were not about to abandon the Broncos (especially with quarterback John Elway in the midst of his Hall of Fame career) in favor of the Gold. Despite finally getting into the playoffs with an 11–7 record, the Gold's attendance crashed to 14,400 fans per game. As a result, despite finishing second in the Western Conference, they were forced to play on the road against the lower-seeded Memphis Showboats under pressure from ABC. The network, who had considerable influence over the USFL due to the structuring of the league's television contract, did not want the embarrassment of having a game played in a near-empty Mile High Stadium.

=== Los Angeles Express ===
The Express never drew well at the cavernous Los Angeles Memorial Coliseum, even in their breakthrough 1984 season. The low attendance figures began to prove very embarrassing and frustrating both to the league and ABC, which had hoped for a more credible product to emanate from the nation's second-largest media market. The team had to play its last home game at John Shepard Stadium on the campus of Pierce College, a small junior college in the San Fernando Valley.

The Arizona Wranglers, despite having the worse record of the two participating teams, got to host the 1984 Western Conference championship game because the Coliseum was being prepared for the 1984 Summer Olympics. To accommodate Arizona's oppressive summer heat, as well as the ABC Sports television schedule, the game kicked off at 8:30 p.m. local time, 11:30 p.m. Eastern time.

The league took over the team for the 1985 season, which was an unmitigated disaster. The team had to continue operating due to the contract's stipulation that there had to be a team in Los Angeles. In one of ABC's biggest blunders, the network declined to air a matchup between the Express and the Houston Gamblers, a game that featured two future Hall of Fame quarterbacks against each other with Gamblers' Jim Kelly rallying to win 34–33 against Steve Young's Express. ABC instead aired Doug Flutie's debut for the New Jersey Generals, resulting in the Gamblers-Express game being nicknamed "The Greatest Game No One Saw." Young and Kelly would eventually face each other in 1992 in the No Punt Game—which, coincidentally, would follow a similar pattern with Kelly's Buffalo Bills rallying to beat Young's San Francisco 49ers 34–31 but, because the 49ers and Bills were both Super Bowl contenders, received extensive national television carriage.

Unable to find a new owner, the USFL announced that the Express would suspend operations for the first fall season in 1986, a factor in the league not securing a broadcast contract for that season.

== Announcers ==
=== ABC ===
1. Keith Jackson/Lynn Swann
2. Jim Lampley/Lee Corso (Lee Corso was also an analyst for ESPN's USFL coverage)
3. Tim Brant/Lee Grosscup
4. Bill Flemming/Ron Mix
5. Corey McPherrin/Kevin Kiley

ABC used Frank Gifford as the studio anchor and Mike Adamle as a sideline reporter. Another play-by-play man that ABC used was Curt Gowdy.

=== Championship game announcers ===
Game	Date	Network	Play-by-play announcers	Color commentators	Sideline reporters	Trophy presentation
1st	July 17, 1983	ABC	Keith Jackson	Lynn Swann	Tim Brant	Tim Brant
2nd	July 15, 1984	ABC	Keith Jackson	Lynn Swann	Tim Brant and Mike Adamle	Mike Adamle
3rd	July 14, 1985	ABC	Keith Jackson	Lynn Swann	Tim Brant	Tim Brant

=== ESPN ===
1. Jim Simpson/Paul Maguire (Mondays)
2. Tom Kelly/Don Heinrich (Saturdays)

ESPN used Tom Mees as a studio anchor.

== Local coverage ==
Team	Play-by-play	Analyst(s)	Flagship station
Chicago Blitz	Lorn Brown	Doug Buffone	WFLD-TV
Houston Gamblers	Bill Worrell		KHTV
Los Angeles Express			KTTV
Michigan Panthers			WKBD
New Orleans Breakers			WNOE (radio); WGNO (TV)
New Jersey Generals	Charley Steiner		WPIX
Oakland Invaders	Joe Starkey		
Pittsburgh Maulers	John Sanders	Steve Talbot	KDKA
Tampa Bay Bandits	Randy Scott		WTOG
Philadelphia Stars	Harry Donahue	Don Tollefson	WPVI

== See also ==
- United States Football League#USFL v. NFL lawsuit

== Sources ==
- United States Football League Broadcasters (1983-1985)
