= Tim Brant =

American sportscaster (born 1949)

Profile
- Positions: Linebacker, defensive end

Personal information
- Born: February 26, 1949 (age 77); Washington, D.C., United States

Career information
- High school: St. John's College High School
- College: Maryland
- NFL draft: 1973: undrafted

Career history
- Washington Redskins (1973)*
- * Offseason or practice squad member only

Tim Brant (born February 26, 1949) is a retired American sportscaster. Brant most recently worked for Raycom Sports and was formerly Vice President, Sports for WJLA-TV in Washington, D.C. He has spent more than forty years covering sports nationally, including for CBS and ABC.

== Early life ==
Brant graduated with a Bachelor of Science in Journalism from the University of Maryland in 1973. He was a defensive captain and a three-year letterman with the Terrapins, the first two as a starting strong side linebacker before shifting to defensive end as a senior when the team switched to a wide tackle six. He played for the Washington Redskins before a career-ending knee injury.

== Broadcasting career ==
=== Raycom Sports ===
Between 2008 and 2016, Brant handled play-by-play duties for both Raycom Sports ACC football and basketball telecasts.

=== ABC Sports ===
Brant has served many roles at ABC Sports, including host, sideline reporter, expert analyst and play-by-play. He first joined ABC Sports as a college football commentator in 1982. Brant would leave ABC for CBS in 1987. In 1991, Brant returned to ABC in the booth as an analyst and play-by-play man for college football, a role he held until 2007.

Brant is often best known for his coverage of college football with Keith Jackson. While with ABC, Brant announced three National Championship games. And while working with Keith Jackson, he was listed as college football's top analyst by numerous publications, including USA Today.

In addition to his college football duties for ABC, Brant has also done play-by-play for College Basketball on ABC, Wide World of Sports, the 1984 Winter and Summer Olympics, the Pro Bowl, USFL and the Pro Bowlers Tour. Brant also had a sideline stint on ABC's Monday Night Football.

=== CBS Sports ===
Brant spent four years at CBS Sports (1987–90) and worked a variety of broadcasts, including the NFL, the NBA and the NCAA basketball tournament. He served as host of CBS Sports Saturday, Winter-Fest, the NCAA basketball tournament Selection Show and the Emmy Award-winning Tour de France coverage. Tim also mentored and worked with childhood friend James Brown. Tim and James grew up together in the Washington, D.C., area.

In 1987 and 1988, Brant was paired with analyst Hank Stram on NFL broadcasts. In 1989, he served as the #4 NFL play-by-play man alongside Dan Jiggetts. One year later, Brant teamed with Jim Nantz on NFL broadcasts. In Nantz's 2008 best-selling book, Jim says that he never forged a friendship as quickly with anyone as he did with Tim Brant.

=== Washington, D.C. ===
Locally, he has hosted sport pre-game specials such as Are You Ready for Washington Redskins games.

Brant hosted the Brant & Parks morning show on WMAL radio in Washington, D.C., for over ten years. His first sportscasting job was at WMAL calling Maryland Terrapins football & basketball games. He was the color commentator with Mal Campbell in 1977 and 1978 and Johnny Holliday in 1979.

He served as vice president, Sports at WJLA-TV in Washington through May 2015. He previously served as the station's sports director from 1978 until 1982.

== Personal life ==
Brant resides in Chevy Chase, Maryland, with his wife Janet. Brant is active in local charitable programs. He has four grown children, Jason, Kevin, Lindsay and Julie. His son, Kevin Brant, was a high school All American football player and a safety at UCLA from 1999 to 2003.
