= NBC college bowl game broadcasts =

NBC broadcast the Rose Bowl beginning in 1952 until the 1988 Rose Bowl when ABC took over. It had the Orange Bowl from 1965 through 1995. (The 1971 contest was the very last sporting event on US television to carry cigarette ads.) NBC also aired the Gator Bowl in 1949 and again from 1969 through 1971 and 1996 through 2006, the Sugar Bowl from 1958 through 1969, the Sun Bowl in 1964 and again in 1966, the Fiesta Bowl from 1978 through 1995, the Citrus Bowl from 1984 through 1985, the Hall of Fame Bowl from 1988 through 1992, and the Cotton Bowl from 1993 to 1995.

== List of broadcasters ==
=== Citrus Bowl ===
Date	Network	Play-by-play announcers	Color commentators	Sideline reporters
December 28, 1985	NBC	Jay Randolph	Dave Rowe	Tom Hammond
December 22, 1984	NBC	Don Criqui	Bob Trumpy	

=== Cotton Bowl ===
Date	Network	Play-by-play	Color commentator(s)	Sideline reporter(s)
January 2, 1995	NBC	Jim Lampley	Todd Christensen	
January 1, 1994	NBC	Charlie Jones	Todd Christensen	
January 1, 1993	NBC	Tom Hammond	Paul Maguire	

=== Fiesta Bowl ===
The Fiesta Bowl began in 1971, but was considered a “minor bowl” until the January 1, 1982 game between Penn State–USC. Since then, the Fiesta Bowl has been considered a major bowl.

Date	Network	Play-by-play	Color commentator(s)	Sideline reporter(s)
January 2, 1995	NBC	Charlie Jones	Randy Cross	Dan Hicks
January 1, 1994	NBC	Tom Hammond	Cris Collinsworth	
January 1, 1993	NBC	Charlie Jones	Todd Christensen	Beasley Reece
January 1, 1992	NBC	Charlie Jones	Todd Christensen	Ahmad Rashad
January 1, 1991	NBC	Charlie Jones	Todd Christensen	Tom Hammond and Gayle Gardner
January 1, 1990	NBC	Charlie Jones	Merlin Olsen	Jimmy Cefalo
January 2, 1989	NBC	Dick Enberg	Merlin Olsen	
January 1, 1988	NBC	Charlie Jones	Jimmy Cefalo	
January 2, 1987	NBC	Charlie Jones	Bob Griese and Jimmy Cefalo	
January 1, 1986	NBC	Charlie Jones	Sam Rutigliano	Gary Gerould
January 1, 1985	NBC	Charlie Jones	Bob Griese	
January 2, 1984	NBC	Charlie Jones	Bob Griese	
January 1, 1983	NBC	Charlie Jones	Len Dawson	
January 1, 1982	NBC	Charlie Jones	Len Dawson	Mike Haffner
December 26, 1980	NBC	Charlie Jones	Len Dawson	Mike Haffner
December 25, 1979	NBC	Charlie Jones	Len Dawson	Mike Haffner
December 25, 1978	NBC	Curt Gowdy	John Brodie	Mike Haffner

=== Gator Bowl ===
Date	Network	Play-by-play announcers	Color commentators	Sideline reporters
January 2, 2006	NBC	Tom Hammond	Pat Haden	Lewis Johnson
January 1, 2005	NBC	Tom Hammond	Pat Haden	Lewis Johnson
January 1, 2004	NBC	Tom Hammond	Pat Haden	Lewis Johnson
January 1, 2003	NBC	Mike Breen	Pat Haden	
January 1, 2002	NBC	Tom Hammond	Pat Haden	
January 1, 2001	NBC	Matt Vasgersian	Pat Haden	
January 1, 2000	NBC	Tom Hammond	James Lofton	Craig Sager
January 1, 1999	NBC	Tom Hammond	Pat Haden	
January 1, 1998	NBC	Charlie Jones	Bob Trumpy	
January 1, 1997	NBC	Don Criqui	Bob Trumpy	
January 1, 1996	NBC	Tom Hammond	Bob Trumpy	
January 2, 1971	NBC	Charlie Jones	George Ratterman	
December 27, 1969	NBC	Curt Gowdy	Al DeRogatis	
January 1, 1949	NBC			

=== Hall of Fame Bowl ===
Date	Network	Play-by-play announcers	Color commentators	Sideline reporters
January 1, 1992	NBC	Don Criqui	Bob Trumpy	Beasley Reece
January 1, 1991	NBC	Joel Meyers	Ahmad Rashad	Paul Maguire
January 1, 1990	NBC	Don Criqui	Ahmad Rashad	Jim Donovan
January 2, 1989	NBC	Tom Hammond	Joe Namath	Armen Keteyian
January 2, 1988	NBC	Bob Costas	Ahmad Rashad and Paul Maguire	

=== Orange Bowl ===
Date	Network	Play-by-play	Color commentator(s)	Sideline reporter(s)
January 1, 1995	NBC	Tom Hammond	Cris Collinsworth	John Dockery
January 1, 1994	NBC	Dick Enberg	Bob Trumpy	O. J. Simpson
January 1, 1993	NBC	Don Criqui	Bob Trumpy	John Dockery
January 1, 1992	NBC	Dick Enberg	Bill Walsh	John Dockery
January 1, 1991	NBC	Dick Enberg	Bill Walsh	O. J. Simpson and Bob Trumpy
January 1, 1990	NBC	Dick Enberg	Bill Walsh	
January 2, 1989	NBC	Don Criqui	Bob Trumpy	Jim Gray
January 1, 1988	NBC	Don Criqui	Bob Trumpy	Tom Hammond
January 1, 1987	NBC	Don Criqui	Bob Trumpy	Paul Maguire
January 1, 1986	NBC	Don Criqui	Bob Trumpy and Bob Griese	Jimmy Cefalo
January 1, 1985	NBC	Don Criqui	Bob Trumpy	Bill Macatee
January 2, 1984	NBC	Don Criqui	John Brodie	Bill Macatee
January 1, 1983	NBC	Don Criqui	John Brodie	
January 1, 1982	NBC	Don Criqui	John Brodie	Bob Trumpy
January 1, 1981	NBC	Don Criqui	John Brodie	Bob Trumpy
January 1, 1980	NBC	Don Criqui	John Brodie	Bob Trumpy
January 1, 1979	NBC	Dick Enberg	Merlin Olsen	
January 2, 1978	NBC	Jim Simpson	Merlin Olsen	
January 1, 1977	NBC	Jim Simpson	John Brodie	
January 1, 1976	NBC	Jim Simpson	John Brodie	
January 1, 1975	NBC	Jim Simpson	John Brodie	
January 1, 1974	NBC	Jim Simpson	Kyle Rote	
January 1, 1973	NBC	Jim Simpson	Kyle Rote	
January 1, 1972	NBC	Jim Simpson	Kyle Rote	Bill Enis
January 1, 1971	NBC	Jim Simpson	Al DeRogatis	
January 1, 1970	NBC	Jim Simpson	Al DeRogatis	
January 1, 1969	NBC	Jim Simpson	Al DeRogatis	
January 1, 1968	NBC	Jim Simpson	Kyle Rote	
January 2, 1967	NBC	Curt Gowdy	Paul Christman	
January 1, 1966	NBC	Curt Gowdy	Paul Christman	
January 1, 1965	NBC	Jim Simpson	Bud Wilkinson	

=== Rose Bowl ===
The 1952 Rose Bowl, on NBC, was the first national telecast of a college football game. The network broadcast both the Tournament of Roses Parade and the following game.

Date	Network	Play-by-play	Color commentator(s)	Sideline reporter(s)
January 1, 1988	NBC	Dick Enberg	Merlin Olsen	
January 1, 1987	NBC	Dick Enberg	Merlin Olsen	
January 1, 1986	NBC	Dick Enberg	Merlin Olsen	
January 1, 1985	NBC	Dick Enberg	Merlin Olsen	
January 2, 1984	NBC	Dick Enberg	Merlin Olsen	
January 1, 1983	NBC	Dick Enberg	Merlin Olsen	
January 1, 1982	NBC	Dick Enberg	Merlin Olsen	
January 1, 1981	NBC	Dick Enberg	Merlin Olsen	
January 1, 1980	NBC	Dick Enberg	Merlin Olsen	O. J. Simpson
January 1, 1979	NBC	Curt Gowdy	John Brodie and O. J. Simpson	
January 2, 1978	NBC	Curt Gowdy	John Brodie	Charlie Jones
January 1, 1977	NBC	Curt Gowdy	Don Meredith	
January 1, 1976	NBC	Curt Gowdy	Al DeRogatis	Ross Porter
January 1, 1975	NBC	Curt Gowdy	Al DeRogatis	Ross Porter
January 1, 1974	NBC	Curt Gowdy	Al DeRogatis	Al DeRogatis
January 1, 1973	NBC	Curt Gowdy	Al DeRogatis	Al DeRogatis
January 1, 1972	NBC	Curt Gowdy	Al DeRogatis	Al DeRogatis
January 1, 1971	NBC	Curt Gowdy	Kyle Rote	
January 1, 1970	NBC	Curt Gowdy	Kyle Rote	
January 1, 1969	NBC	Curt Gowdy	Kyle Rote	
January 1, 1968	NBC	Curt Gowdy	Paul Christman	
January 2, 1967	NBC	Lindsey Nelson	Terry Brennan	
January 1, 1966	NBC	Lindsey Nelson	Terry Brennan	
January 1, 1965	NBC	Lindsey Nelson	Ray Scott	
January 1, 1964	NBC	Lindsey Nelson	Terry Brennan	
January 1, 1963	NBC	Mel Allen		
January 1, 1962	NBC	Mel Allen		
January 2, 1961	NBC	Mel Allen	Chick Hearn	
January 1, 1960	NBC	Mel Allen	Chick Hearn	
January 1, 1959	NBC	Mel Allen	Chick Hearn	
January 1, 1958	NBC	Mel Allen	Chick Hearn	
January 1, 1957	NBC	Mel Allen		
January 2, 1956	NBC	Mel Allen	Sam Balter	
January 1, 1955	NBC	Mel Allen		
January 1, 1954	NBC	Mel Allen	Tom Harmon	
January 1, 1953	NBC	Mel Allen		
January 1, 1952	NBC	Mel Allen	Jack Brickhouse	

=== Sugar Bowl ===
Date	Network	Play-by-play	Color commentator(s)	Sideline reporter(s)
January 1, 1969	NBC	Charlie Jones	George Ratterman	
January 1, 1968	NBC	Charlie Jones	Elmer Angsman	
January 2, 1967	NBC	Jim Simpson	Charlie Jones	
January 1, 1966	NBC	Jim Simpson	Bud Wilkinson	
January 1, 1965	NBC	Bill Flemming	Terry Brennan	
January 1, 1964	NBC	Ray Scott	Frankie Albert	
January 1, 1963	NBC	Ray Scott	Frankie Albert	
January 1, 1962	NBC	Lindsey Nelson	Lee Giroux	
January 2, 1961	NBC	Lindsey Nelson	Red Grange	
January 2, 1961	NBC	Lindsey Nelson	Red Grange	Red Grange
January 1, 1960	NBC	Lindsey Nelson	Red Grange	Red Grange
January 1, 1959	NBC	Lindsey Nelson	Red Grange	Red Grange
January 1, 1958				Red Grange

=== Sun Bowl ===
Date	Network	Play-by-play announcers	Color commentators	Sideline reporters
1966	NBC	Jim Simpson	Charlie Jones	
1964	NBC	Ray Scott	Frankie Albert	

== See also ==
- College football on television
- NFL on NBC
  - NFL on NBC announcers
- NBC College Football Game of the Week
- Notre Dame Football on NBC
