= The Insider (newsletter) =

American newsletter

- Type: Biweekly political newsletter
- Owner(s): Neri & Associates; NeriVerbanac Public Affairs (former)
- Editor-in-chief: Albert J. Neri; John Verbanac (former)
- Founded: 2002
- Website: www.insiderpa.com/

The Insider was a subscription-based newsletter reporting on Pennsylvania politics.

== Reach ==
It was once described as the "state's most widely read newsletter devoted to state politics and government." With an audience of both the "hard-core state political junkie and the casual political observer," The Insider featured interviews with state politicians and political analysis for activities at the Pennsylvania State Capitol. It has been called a "biweekly guide to the capital's back room deals" and "a twice-monthly political capsule" by the Pittsburgh Post-Gazette.

== Publication history ==
The Insider was developed in 2002 by the late Al Neri, a veteran political commentator with over 20 years of political experience, and political operative John Verbanac, a protegee of Pennsylvania Senator Rick Santorum. Within a short period of time, the Insider became the largest statewide political publication. Verbanac and Neri parted ways amicably in 2005 and The Insider was incorporated into the GovNetPA system. The editorial opinions expressed in The Insider were exclusively of Neri, unless the article carries a different by-line. Other individuals occasionally publish material in The Insider, including David Buffington, who is best known as the former editor of the Pennsylvania Report, a publication similar to The Insider.
