= NFL on television in the 1960s =

Since the 1960s, all regular season and playoff games broadcast in the United States have been aired by national television networks. When the rival American Football League (AFL) began in 1960, it signed a 5-year television contract with ABC. This became the first ever cooperative television plan for professional football, through which the proceeds of the contract were divided equally among member clubs. ABC and the AFL also introduced moving, on-field cameras (as opposed to the fixed midfield cameras of CBS and the NFL), and were the first to have players "miked" during broadcast games. As the AFL also had players' names stitched on their jerseys, it was easier for both TV viewers and people at the games to tell who was who.

As of the 1961 season, CBS held the rights to all but one of the NFL's teams; the Cleveland Browns had a separate contract with Sports Network Incorporated (SNI) to carry their games over a regional network. However, the Browns and SNI were forced to break their deal when the NFL and CBS devised their own revenue sharing plan after CBS agreed to telecast all regular season games for an annual fee of $4.65 million. A special antitrust exemption, the Sports Broadcasting Act of 1961, was passed in Congress to accommodate the collective contract, which restricted what days the league could televise their games. CBS' fee later increased to $14.1 million per year in 1964, and $18.8 million per year in 1966.

With NBC paying the AFL $36 million in 1965 to televise its games, and the intensified battle over college prospects, both leagues negotiated a merger agreement on June 8, 1966. Although they would not officially merge into one combined league until 1970, one of the conditions of the agreement was that the winners of each league's championship game would meet in a contest to determine the "world champion of football."

The first ever AFL-NFL World Championship Game was played on January 15, 1967, between the NFL champion Packers and the AFL champion Chiefs. As CBS held the rights to nationally televise NFL games and NBC had the rights to broadcast AFL matches, it was decided that both would cover that first game. The next three AFL-NFL World Championship Games, the initial Super Bowls, were then divided by the two networks: CBS broadcast Super Bowls II and IV while NBC covered III.

== Year-by-year breakdown ==
=== 1960 ===
NBC held individual team contracts with the Pittsburgh Steelers and Baltimore Colts in 1959, 1960 and 1961. While the games were blacked out in Pittsburgh and Baltimore, they were broadcast on other NBC stations. In some cases, the game broadcast was seen on CBS in the visiting team's home region. NBC covered eleven games in 1960 and 13 games in 1961 in a "Game of the Week" format. NBC would take one week off due to its coverage of the World Series. During this era, NBC broadcast pre-recorded and edited hour-long broadcasts of NFL games in the off-season under the title Best of Pro Football.

On June 9, 1960, the AFL signed a five-year television contract with ABC, which brought in revenues of approximately $2,125,000 per year for the entire league. The deal called for ABC to broadcast approximately 37 regular season games, the AFL Championship Game and the AFL All-Star Game. These games were typically broadcast regionally on 15 consecutive Sundays and on Thanksgiving Day. This became the first-ever cooperative television plan for professional football, in which the proceeds of the contract were divided equally among member clubs; the National Football League would follow suit in 1961, a move that required Congress to pass the Sports Broadcasting Act of 1961 to accommodate such collective broadcasting contracts.

=== 1961 ===
On April 5, 1961, NBC was awarded a two-year contract (1961–62) for the radio and television rights to the NFL Championship Game, paying US$615,000 annually for the rights ($300,000 of which was to go directly into the NFL Player Benefit Plan). On May 23, 1963, NBC was awarded exclusive network broadcast rights for the 1963 NFL Championship Game for $926,000.

In 1961, then-CBS affiliate WISN-TV (channel 12, now an ABC affiliate) in Milwaukee opted not to carry that year's annual telecast of The Wizard of Oz, running a Green Bay Packers football game instead. In contrast to the infamous Heidi telecast in 1968, the popularity of The Wizard of Oz as an annual television event at that time was such that the station ran the movie locally at a later date. On September 17, 1961, CBS Sports broadcast the first remote 15-minute pre-game show, the first of its kind on network sports television; Pro Football Kickoff originated from NFL stadiums around the country with a comprehensive look at all the day's games. Hosted by Johnny Lujack, the program originated from NFL stadiums around the country with a comprehensive look at the day's games. This show was succeeded in 1962 and 1963 by NFL Kickoff, with Kyle Rote serving as its host.

=== 1962 ===
In 1962, the NFL followed the American Football League's (AFL) suit with its own revenue sharing plan after CBS agreed to telecast all regular season games for an annual fee of US$4.65 million. CBS also acquired the rights to the championship games for 1964 and 1965 for $1.8 million per game, on April 17, 1964.

The Colts and Redskins had some sort of co-op arrangement for 1962. In this instance, for the Week 1 game between Los Angeles-Baltimore game was seen throughout the vast Redskins network that extended all the way to the Florida Keys. Meanwhile, the Washington-Dallas game was seen only on Channel 9 in the DC viewing area. The Colts network in 1962 consisted of about four stations; Baltimore, Salisbury, York, Pennsylvania, and Harrisburg, Pennsylvania. Meanwhile, the Redskins network covered DC, Virginia, the Carolinas, Georgia, Alabama, Florida at least. For Week 3, the Detroit-Baltimore game was apparently seen on the full Colts/Redskins network. Meanwhile, the St. Louis-Washington game seen only on the Cardinals network.

The New York-Cleveland game on September 16, marked Pat Summerall's debut as an NFL game commentator. Summerall worked alongside Chris Schenkel for the New York market while Ken Coleman and Warren Lahr called the game for the Cleveland market. The Browns network plugged into the Pittsburgh-Washington game in Week 14. It used its own audio with Coleman and Lahr calling the game. Coleman had apparently taken the red-eye across the country after working the first half (Bob Fouts called the second half alongside color commentator Gordy Soltau) of the December 15 national telecast between the Browns and San Francisco 49ers in San Francisco.

CBS executive vice president James T. Aubrey, Jr., who on May 9, 1963, warned the network's affiliates the high cost of rights for professional sports could price them off television, nevertheless in January 1964 agreed to pay $28.2 million to air National Football League games for two years, spanning 17 games each season. In an interview with The New York Times, Aubrey said regarding the package, "We know how much these games mean to the viewing audience, our affiliated stations, and the nation's advertisers". Along with obtaining the aforementioned rights to the NFL Championship Game, in April 1964, he agreed to extend the deal for another year for a total of $31.8 million.

=== 1963 ===
CBS executive vice president James T. Aubrey, Jr., who on May 9, 1963, warned the network's affiliates the high cost of rights for professional sports could price them off television, nevertheless in January 1964 agreed to pay $28.2 million to air National Football League games for two years, spanning 17 games each season. In an interview with The New York Times, Aubrey said regarding the package, "We know how much these games mean to the viewing audience, our affiliated stations, and the nation's advertisers". Along with obtaining the aforementioned rights to the NFL Championship Game, in April 1964, he agreed to extend the deal for another year for a total of $31.8 million.

On November 24, 1963, just two days after the assassination of President John F. Kennedy, the NFL played its normal schedule of games. Commissioner Pete Rozelle said about playing the games: "It has been traditional in sports for athletes to perform in times of great personal tragedy. Football was Mr. Kennedy's game. He thrived on competition." No NFL games were telecast, since on the afternoon of the 22nd, just after the president had been pronounced dead, CBS President Frank Stanton ordered that all regular programming be pre-empted until after Kennedy was buried at his funeral procession. Normal programming, including the NFL, was replaced by non-stop news coverage, broadcast without commercials. Less than one hour prior to kickoff of the games in the Eastern Time Zone, Lee Harvey Oswald, who had been charged with Kennedy's assassination, was himself shot to death by Jack Ruby in the basement of the Dallas city jail as he was being transferred to the Dallas County jail.

NBC televised the NFL Championship Game until 1963. The contract for the title game was separate from the regular season contracts held by CBS, which started televising NFL games in 1956. Prior to 1962, each team had its own individual television contract. (This was in contrast to the American Football League as well as established practice in college football, both of which forced all of their members to participate in a collective television contract. As the legality of such a collective contract was still in question at the time, and would eventually be declared illegal in 1984, the NFL did not pursue such a contract until Congress explicitly allowed for the NFL to do so, with conditions, in the Sports Broadcasting Act of 1961.)

=== 1964 ===
In 1964, CBS experimented with a "half-and-half" format for their announcers. The first half of each telecast would be called by the home teams' commentators while the second half would be done by the visitors' commentators (this practice would later be revived decades later by the NFL Network when replaying preseason games that were broadcast by local stations as opposed to a national network). Also in 1964, CBS ditched the concept of using pooled video and split audio feeds. In 1962 and 1963, CBS would provide separate audio for a telecast (for instance, if the Green Bay Packers hosted the Chicago Bears, the telecast would have the same video, Chicago area viewers watching on WBBM-TV would hear Red Grange and George Connor call the action; meanwhile, viewers in Milwaukee and other parts of Wisconsin (Green Bay itself was blacked out) would hear Ray Scott and Tony Canadeo describe the game). Ray Scott was not a fan of the separate audio concept and temporarily left CBS for a job calling a regional slate of college football games for NBC. Ultimately, CBS dumped the four-man crew and resumed the 1962–63 method for the great majority of games in 1965, 1966 and 1967.

On September 13, 1964, Frank Gifford began hosting the renamed NFL Report, which was subsequently retitled The NFL Today later that season. This version of The NFL Today was a 15-minute, regional sports program that presented interviews with NFL players and coaches, and news and features about the league.

=== 1965 ===
CBS' afternoon exhibition telecast of Dallas vs. San Francisco on August 21, 1965, was interrupted by coverage of the Gemini V blastoff, which resulted in a healthy amount of angry phone calls from fans. The game (called by John Roach, Frank Glieber, and Gordy Soltau) was subsequently broadcast on tape-delay basis the following afternoon in a number of cities due to the late start. The August 26 exhibition game between Baltimore-Cleveland game (called by Glieber and Pat Summerall) however was not tape-delayed. it was the nightcap of Art Modell's exhibition doubleheader that ran from 1962-71.

On November 25, 1965 (Thanksgiving Day), CBS featured the first color broadcast of a regular-season NFL game, the traditional Thanksgiving Day game at Detroit. It was only the second time that the network's first color mobile unit had been used (it had been used a month earlier to cover the attempted launch of an Atlas-Agena, which was to have been the rendezvous target for the Gemini 6 space mission). Only a handful of games during the rest of the season were shown in color, along with the NFL Western Conference Playoff, the NFL Championship Game, the Playoff Bowl and the Pro Bowl. In 1966, most of the network's NFL games were broadcast in color, and by 1968, all of the network's NFL telecasts were in color.

On December 29, 1965, CBS acquired the rights to the NFL regular season games in 1966 and 1967, with an option to extend the contract through 1968, for $18.8 million per year (in sharp contrast to the $14.1 million per year it paid for the rights in 1964). On February 14, 1966, the rights to the 1966 and 1967 NFL Championship Games (the Ice Bowl) were sold to CBS for $2 million per game. 1967 also marked the last year that CBS had separate commentator crews for each team for about 90% to 95% of their NFL games.

=== 1966 ===
In Week 11 of the 1966 season, the Philadelphia-San Francisco game was a regional telecast with a single audio feed. San Francisco play-by-play announcer Bob Fouts worked with Philadelphia analyst Tom Brookshier, while Chick Hearn was called in for CBS Control duty. For that year's Thanksgiving Day game, CBS aired a "day/twilight" doubleheader that were both in color. For the San Francisco-Detroit game, Van Patrick and Frank Gifford called the first half while Bob Fouts and Gifford worked the second half. For the Cleveland-Dallas game, Jack Buck and Pat Summerall were on the call for the first half, while Frank Glieber and Summerall announced the second half. Week 12's Green Bay-Minnesota game was the Sunday doubleheader telecast. Hal Scott called the first half, while Ray Scott called the second half. Tony Canadeo was the analyst for the full game and Jim Morse had CBS Control duties. For Week 12, St. Louis-Dallas was the main doubleheader game with Jack Buck and Eddie LeBaron working the first half and Jack Drees and LeBaron calling the second half.

On December 13, 1966, the rights to the Super Bowl for four years were sold to CBS and NBC for $9.5 million. The first ever AFL-NFL World Championship Game was played on January 15, 1967. Because CBS held the rights to nationally televise NFL games and NBC had the rights to broadcast AFL games, it was decided by the newly merged league to have both of them cover that first game (the only other NFL game since to have been carried nationally on more than one network until December 29, 2007 New England Patriots-New York Giants game, which aired on NBC, CBS and the NFL Network). However, NBC was also forced to broadcast the game over CBS' feed and cameras (CBS received prerogative to use its feed and camera angles since the Coliseum was home to the NFL's Rams), while only CBS' cameras and technical crew were allowed to work the game, although NBC was allowed to use its own commentators. As a result, NBC's crew had little to no control over how the game was filmed. Each network used its own announcers: Ray Scott (doing play-by-play for the first half), Jack Whitaker (doing play-by-play for the second half) and Frank Gifford provided commentary on CBS; while Curt Gowdy and Paul Christman did so for NBC. NBC did have some problems with the dual telecast; the network did not return in time from a halftime commercial break for the start of the second half. Therefore, the first kickoff was stopped by the game's officials and was redone once NBC returned to the broadcast.

=== 1967 ===
The first AFL-NFL World Championship Game was played on January 15, 1967. Because CBS held the rights to nationally televise NFL games and NBC had the rights to broadcast AFL games, it was decided by the newly merged league to have both of them cover that first game. Ray Scott, Jack Whitaker, Frank Gifford and Pat Summerall called the game for CBS. 39.9 million viewers would watch Bart Starr's performance in the game that earned him the MVP trophy. NBC did have some problems. The network did not return from a commercial break during halftime in time for the start of the second half; therefore, the first kickoff was stopped by the game's officials and was redone once NBC was back on the air. NBC was also forced to broadcast the game over CBS' feed and cameras (CBS received prerogative to use its feed and camera angles since the Los Angeles Memorial Coliseum was home to the NFL's Rams). In other words, NBC's crew had little to no control over how the game was shot. The next three AFL-NFL World Championship Games, later renamed the Super Bowl, were then divided by the two networks: CBS televised Super Bowls II and IV while NBC covered Super Bowl III.

During the week, tensions flared between the staffs of the two networks (longtime arch-rivals in American broadcasting), who each wanted to win the ratings war, to the point where a fence was built between the CBS and NBC trucks.

Each network used its own announcers: Ray Scott (doing play-by-play for the first half), Jack Whitaker (doing play-by-play for the second half) and Frank Gifford provided commentary on CBS, while Curt Gowdy and Paul Christman were on NBC. While Rozelle allowed NBC to telecast the game, he decreed it would not be able to use its cameramen and technical personnel, instead forcing it to use the feed provided by CBS, since the Coliseum was home to the NFL's Rams.

Super Bowl I was the only Super Bowl in history that was not a sellout in terms of attendance, despite a TV blackout in the Los Angeles area (at the time, NFL games were required to be blacked out in the market of origin, even if it was a neutral site game and if it sold out). Of the 94,000-seat capacity in the Coliseum, 33,000 went unsold. Days before the game, local newspapers printed editorials about what they viewed as a then-exorbitant $12 price for tickets, and wrote stories about how viewers could pull in the game from stations in surrounding markets such as Bakersfield, Santa Barbara and San Diego.

In 1967, The NFL Today expanded to a 30-minute format preceding game coverage.

Week 4 of the 1967 AFL season coincided with the race for the American League pennant. NBC decided to focus on their baseball coverage instead of covering the early games; thus resulting in Curt Gowdy calling the Twins-Red Sox game; Jim Simpson calling the Angels-Tigers game); while the AFL schedule resulted in the two early games (Broncos-Oilers and Dolphins-Jets games not being televised with another Chargers-Bills game being a locally televised game airing only in San Diego on then-NBC affiliate KOGO (now ABC affiliate KGTV).

=== 1968 ===
Super Bowl II was televised in the United States by CBS, with Ray Scott handling the play-by-play duties and color commentators Pat Summerall and Jack Kemp in the broadcast booth. Kemp was the first Super Bowl commentator who was still an active player (with Buffalo of the AFL) at the time of the broadcast. The CBS telecast of this game is considered lost; all that survives are in-game photos, most of which were shown in the January 8, 1969 edition of Sports Illustrated. Not even NFL Films, the league's official filmmaker, has a copy of the full game available; however, they do have game footage that they used for their game highlight film.

Unlike the previous year's game, Super Bowl II was televised live on only one network, which has been the case for all subsequent Super Bowl games. While the Orange Bowl was sold out for the game, the NFL's unconditional blackout rules in place then prevented the live telecast from being shown in the Miami area.

During the latter part of the second quarter, and again for three minutes of halftime, almost 80 percent of the country (with the exceptions of New York City, Cleveland, Philadelphia and much of the Northeast) lost the video feed of the CBS broadcast. CBS, who had paid $2.5 million for broadcast rights, blamed the glitch on a breakdown in AT&T cable lines. The overnight Arbitron rating was 43.0, a slight increase from Super Bowl I's combined CBS-NBC rating of 42.2.

When CBS decided to abandon its practice of using dedicated announcing crews for particular teams in 1968, the network instituted a semi-merit system in its place, with certain crews (such as Ray Scott and Paul Christman or Jack Buck and Pat Summerall) being assigned to each week's most prominent games regardless of the participating teams.

One of the most remembered games on NBC was a 1968 game known as the Heidi Game. As its nationally televised game between the Oakland Raiders and New York Jets running late, the network discontinued coverage while the game was still playing to air the movie Heidi just moments after the Jets' Jim Turner kicked what appeared to be the game-winning field goal with 1:05 remaining. While millions of irate fans, missing the finale, jammed NBC's phone lines, the Raiders scored two touchdowns in eight seconds during the final minute to win 43–32.

The reaction to The Heidi Game resulted in the AFL, and most other sports leagues, demanding thereafter that television networks broadcast all games to their conclusion. NFL contracts with the networks now require games to be shown in a team's market area to conclusion, regardless of the score.

To avoid a repeat incident, a 1975 NBC broadcast of Willy Wonka & the Chocolate Factory was delayed until the completion of a Washington Redskins–Raiders game. The network installed a new phone in the control room wired to a separate exchange, becoming known as the Heidi Phone, to prevent this situation from occurring in the future.

On December 22, 1968, CBS interrupted coverage of a Western Conference championship game between the Minnesota Vikings and Baltimore Colts to show a broadcast from inside the Apollo 8 spacecraft, headed towards the Moon (the first crewed space mission to orbit the Moon, and a major step towards the lunar landing the following July). The interruption began approximately three minutes before halftime of the game, and lasted 17 minutes. CBS showed highlights of the missed action (in which neither team scored) when the network returned to football coverage; nonetheless, the network received approximately 3,000 complaints after the game.

=== 1969 ===
The next three AFL-NFL World Championship Games, later renamed the Super Bowl, were then divided by the two networks (with each network broadcasting the game exclusively): CBS broadcast Super Bowls II and IV while NBC covered III. When NBC Sports broadcast Super Bowl III, sports broadcasts were produced under the oversight of the NBC News division (this remained the case until well into the 1970s, long after both CBS and ABC had spun-off their sports operations into departments separate from their news divisions). Curt Gowdy handled the play-by-play duties and was joined by color commentators Al DeRogatis and Kyle Rote in the broadcast booth. Also helping with NBC's coverage were Jim Simpson (reporting from the sidelines) and Pat Summerall (helping conduct player interviews for the pregame show, along with Rote). In an interview later done with NFL Films, Gowdy called it the most memorable game he ever called because of its historical significance. While the Orange Bowl was sold out for the game, the live telecast was not shown in Miami due to both leagues' unconditional blackout rules at the time. This game is thought to be the earliest surviving Super Bowl game preserved on videotape in its entirety save for a portion of the Baltimore Colts' fourth quarter scoring drive.

In the late 1960s and early 1970s, CBS used a marching band-like instrumental arrangement of the song "Confidence" (from Leon Carr's score for the 1964 off-Broadway musical The Secret Life of Walter Mitty) as the theme for their NFL broadcasts.

With 1969 being the final season before the AFL–NFL merger, this was also the final season where both leagues would have Thanksgiving doubleheaders. Starting in 1970, only two games would be played on Thanksgiving, with the Lions and Cowboys hosting those games, and an AFC team rotating as the visiting team between Detroit and Dallas every year.

== See also ==
- NFL on television
- History of the NFL on television
- List of NFL Championship Game broadcasters
- List of AFL Championship Game broadcasters
- List of Super Bowl broadcasters
