= List of AFL Championship Game broadcasters =

The following is a list of television and radio networks and announcers that have broadcast the American Football League Championship Game, which was played from 1960–1969 prior to the American Football League's merger with the National Football League.

== Television ==
On June 9, 1960, the league signed a five-year television contract with ABC, which brought in revenues of approximately $2.125 million per year for the entire league. On January 29, 1964, the AFL signed a lucrative $36 million television contract with NBC (beginning in the 1965 season), which gave the league money it needed to compete with the NFL for players.

Year	Network	Play-by-play	Color commentator(s)	Sideline reporter(s)
1969	NBC	Curt Gowdy	Kyle Rote	Al DeRogatis
1968	NBC	Curt Gowdy	Kyle Rote	Charlie Jones
1967	NBC	Curt Gowdy	Paul Christman	
1966	NBC	Curt Gowdy	Paul Christman	Pat Hernon
1965	NBC	Curt Gowdy	Paul Christman	Charlie Jones
1964	ABC	Curt Gowdy	Paul Christman	George Ratterman
1963	ABC	Curt Gowdy	Paul Christman	
1962	ABC	Curt Gowdy	Paul Christman	Jack Buck
1961	ABC	Jack Buck	George Ratterman	Bob Neal
1960	ABC	Jack Buck	George Ratterman	Les Keiter

== Notes ==
- 1965 – Because of the smaller venue, the attendance was nearly 10,000 lower than 1964, but the television money was increased with NBC.
- 1964 – Held six days after the completion of the 1964 regular season, it was the only AFL title game not played on Sunday, as well as the final one televised in black-and-white. This was the last AFL game on ABC television; rights were sold in January 1964 to NBC for $36 million over five years, beginning with the 1965 season. With the new television deal with NBC, the players' shares for the AFL title game nearly doubled in 1965. This infusion of cash helped spur a bidding war for talent with the NFL, which led to the AFL–NFL merger agreement in June 1966. With the exception of the 1966 Continental Football League championship, ABC did not carry pro football again until after the completion of the merger and the subsequent creation of Monday Night Football for the 1970 season.
- 1960 – To preclude the possibility of having to compete with an NFL title game in close proximity for an audience, AFL owners initially agreed that its Western champions would host in even numbered years, with Eastern champions hosting in odd numbered years. Thus, the first game was originally scheduled to be played in the 103,000 capacity Los Angeles Coliseum. However, the Chargers had drawn less than 10,000 fans per home game. With the still-fledgling league fearing the prospect that ABC would pull its contract because of very poor ticket sales, the Chargers, the Oilers and the League mutually agreed to move the game to the smaller Jeppesen Stadium in Houston, where it drew a near-capacity 32,183.

== Radio ==
Year	Network	Play-by-play	Color commentator(s)
1968	NBC	Jim Simpson	Al DeRogatis
1965	NBC	Herb Carneal	George Ratterman

== See also ==
- History of the NFL on television
  - NFL on American television
