= List of NFL on NBC announcers =

NFL on NBC announcers include:

== Current ==
=== Play-by-play ===
- Mike Tirico: lead play-by-play (2022–present)
- Noah Eagle: play-by-play (2023–present)

=== Game analysts ===
- Cris Collinsworth: lead analyst (2009–present)
- Todd Blackledge: analyst (2023–present)
- Jason Garrett: game and studio analyst (2022–present)

=== Studio hosts ===
- Maria Taylor: studio host (2021–present)

=== Studio analysts ===
- Mike Florio: studio analyst (2012–present)
- Jason Garrett: game and studio analyst (2022–present)
- Devin McCourty: studio analyst (2023–present)
- Mike Tomlin: studio analyst (2026-present)

=== Sideline reporters ===
- Melissa Stark: lead sideline reporter (2022–present)
- Kathryn Tappen: sideline reporter (2014–present)
- Kaylee Hartung: sideline reporter (2024–present)

== Former ==
=== A ===
- Mike Adamle
- Frankie Albert
- Marv Albert
- Lionel Aldridge
- Mel Allen
- Lyle Alzado
- Ken Anderson
- Elmer Angsman
- Pete Axthelm

=== B ===
- Sam Balter
- Tiki Barber
- Len Berman
- Jerome Bettis
- Matthew Berry
- Rocky Bleier
- Lou Boda
- Mike Breen
- Drew Brees
- Jack Brickhouse
- John Brodie
- Jack Buck
- Chris Burford
- Paul Burmeister
- Mike Bush

=== C ===
- Dave Casper
- Jimmy Cefalo
- Bob Chandler
- Todd Christensen
- Paul Christman
- Jac Collinsworth
- George Conner
- Bob Costas
- Don Criqui
- Randy Cross
- Heather Cox
- Larry Csonka

=== D ===
- Willie Davis
- Len Dawson
- Frank Deford
- Sam DeLuca
- Al DeRogatis
- Mike Ditka
- John Dockery
- Todd Donoho
- Jim Donovan
- Tony Dungy
- Braven Dyer

=== E ===
- Rich Eisen
- Carl Eller
- Dick Enberg
- Bill Enis

=== F ===
- Ahmed Fareed
- Marshall Faulk
- Bill Flemming
- Doug Flutie
- Dan Fouts

=== G ===
- Gayle Gardner
- Gary Gerould
- Jim Gibbons
- Joe Gibbs
- Lee Giroux
- Marty Glickman
- Bob Golic
- Drew Goodman
- Bailey Goss
- Curt Gowdy
- Red Grange
- Jim Gray
- Bob Griese
- Lee Grosscup
- Bryant Gumbel
- Greg Gumbel

=== H ===
- Mike Haffner
- Tom Hammond
- Dan Hampton
- John Hannah
- Kevin Harlan
- Merle Harmon
- Rodney Harrison
- Pat Hernon
- Dan Hicks

=== I ===
- Tunch Ilkin
- Bill Innis
- Michael Irvin

=== J ===
- Michael Jackson
- Butch Johnson
- Charlie Jones

=== K ===
- Jim Kelly
- Bob Kelley
- Dave Kocourek
- Steve Kornacki
- Bob Kuechenberg
- George Kunz

=== L ===
- Jim Lampley
- Jim Laslavic
- Lee Leonard
- Floyd Little
- Bob Lobel
- James Lofton
- Mike Lucci

=== M ===
- Bill Macatee
- John Madden
- Paul Maguire
- Dave Marash
- Steve Mariucci
- Harvey Martin
- Will McDonough
- Liam McHugh
- Don Meredith
- Joel Meyers
- Al Michaels
- Sam Milburn
- Joe Montana
- Jim E. Mora
- Johnny Morris
- Jon Morris

=== N ===
- Joe Namath
- Sam Nover

=== O ===
- Bart Oates
- Bill O'Donnell
- Keith Olbermann
- Merlin Olsen

=== P ===
- Bill Parcells
- Dan Patrick
- Ed Podolak
- Ross Porter
- Mel Proctor

=== R ===
- Jay Randolph
- George Ratterman
- Ahmad Rashad
- Fred Roggin
- Chris Rose
- Spencer Ross
- Kyle Rote
- Dave Rowe
- Beasley Reece
- Reggie Rucker
- Sam Rutigliano
- Tim Ryan

=== S ===
- Adam Schefter
- Chris Schenkel
- Mark Scott
- Ray Scott
- Gayle Sierens
- Chris Simms
- Phil Simms
- Jim Simpson
- O. J. Simpson
- Kevin Slaten
- Gordy Soltau
- Steve Smith Sr.
- Bill Stern
- Dick Stockton
- Phil Stone
- Hannah Storm
- Pat Summerall
- Bill Symes

=== T ===
- Michele Tafoya
- Amber Theoharis
- Chuck Thompson
- Bob Trumpy
- Joe Tucker
- Jim Turner

=== V ===
- Matt Vasgersian

=== W ===
- Bill Walsh
- Paul Warfield
- Kurt Warner
- Gene Washington
- Reggie Wayne
- Mike Webster
- Bill Wilkerson
- Bud Wilkinson
- Harry Wismer
- Bob Wolff
- Sam Wyche

=== Z ===
- Paul Zimmerman

== See also ==
- NFL on NBC
- Football Night in America
- NBC Sunday Night Football
