= American Football League on NBC =

TV program

- Also known as: AFL on NBC
- Genre: AFL game telecasts
- Written by: Roy Silver
- Directed by: Ted Nathanson
- Presented by: See list of commentators
- Country of origin: United States
- Original language: English
- No. of seasons: 5

Production
- Executive producer: Scotty Connal
- Producers: Dick Auerbach; Don Ellis; Lou Kusserow
- Production locations: Various AFL stadiums (game telecasts)
- Camera setup: Multi-camera
- Running time: 210 minutes or until game ends
- Production company: NBC Sports

Original release
- Network: NBC
- Release: September 11, 1965 – January 16, 1970

Related
- American Football League on ABC; NFL on NBC

American Football League (AFL) on NBC is a television program that broadcast professional football games of the then fledgling (when compared to the more established National Football League) American Football League (AFL) on NBC.

Beginning in 1965, NBC signed an agreement to carry the AFL's telecasts, which carried over with the American Football Conference (AFC) when the AFL merged with the NFL.

== History ==
On January 29, 1964, NBC signed a five-year deal with the American Football League (replacing ABC in that role), paying them US$36 million to televise its games.

The 1965 AFL season began many occasions through the years of NBC's October Sunday telecasts that being forced to shift to local stations and productions due to NBC's commitment to postseason baseball. For example, Week 5's game between Kansas City and Denver was aired on Kansas City's WDAF 4. Charlie Jones and Ken Case were on the call for the Chiefs-Broncos game. And with NBC focusing color cameras for the World Series in Los Angeles, it is likely that Week 5's San Diego-Buffalo game (called by Curt Gowdy and Paul Christman) was televised in black and white.

For the 1966 AFL season, NBC would feature about 40 games in color, including their three postseason telecasts. With massive wattage from the Orange Bowl floodlights, the New York-Miami game (called by Curt Gowdy and Paul Christman) from Week 2 was likely the first pro football night game ever to be televised in color. With Game 4 of the 1966 World Series landing in Week 6 of the AFL season, and the AFL schedule reflects the priority. Therefore, the Miami-Oakland (called by Charlie Jones and Paul Christman) was seen after the World Series clincher, possibly already in progress. For Week 14, Curt Gowdy and Paul Christman called a late afternoon game in the Oakland (the Raiders were playing the Jets on December 3) on Saturday, flew a red-eye to Boston, and then called the Buffalo-Boston game the next day at 1 p.m.

=== The introduction of the Super Bowl ===
On December 13, 1966, the rights to the Super Bowl for four years were sold to CBS and NBC for $9.5 million. The first ever AFL-NFL World Championship Game was played on January 15, 1967. Because CBS held the rights to nationally televise NFL games and NBC had the rights to broadcast AFL games, it was decided by the newly merged league to have both of them cover that first game (the only pro football game to have been carried nationally on more than one network until December 29, 2007, with the New England Patriots-New York Giants game, which aired on NBC, CBS and the NFL Network). However, NBC was forced to broadcast the game over CBS' feed and cameras (CBS received prerogative to use its feed and camera angles since the Coliseum was home to the NFL's Rams), while only CBS' cameras and technical crew were allowed to work the game, although NBC was allowed to use its own commentators. As a result, NBC's crew had little to no control over how the game was broadcast. Each network used its own announcers: Ray Scott (doing play-by-play for the first half), Jack Whitaker (doing play-by-play for the second half) and Frank Gifford providing commentary on CBS; while Curt Gowdy and Paul Christman did so for NBC. NBC did have some problems with the dual telecast; the network did not return in time from a halftime commercial break for the start of the second half. Therefore, the first kickoff was stopped by the game's officials and was redone once NBC returned to the broadcast.

The next three AFL-NFL World Championship Games, later renamed the Super Bowl, were then divided by the two networks (with each network broadcasting the game exclusively): CBS broadcast Super Bowls II and IV while NBC covered III. When NBC Sports broadcast Super Bowl III, sports broadcasts were produced under the oversight of the NBC News division (this remained the case until 1978, long after both CBS and ABC had spun off their sports operations into departments separate from their news divisions). Curt Gowdy handled the play-by-play duties and was joined by color commentators Al DeRogatis and Kyle Rote in the broadcast booth. Also helping with NBC's coverage were Jim Simpson (reporting from the sidelines) and Pat Summerall (helping conduct player interviews for the pregame show, along with Rote). In an interview later conducted with NFL Films, Gowdy called it the most memorable game he ever called because of its historical significance. While the Orange Bowl was sold out for the game, the live telecast was not shown in Miami due to both leagues' unconditional blackout rules at the time. This game is thought to be the earliest surviving Super Bowl game preserved on videotape in its entirety save for a portion of the Baltimore Colts' fourth-quarter scoring drive.

=== Conflicts with NBC's Major League Baseball coverage ===
Week 4 of the 1967 AFL season coincided with the race for the American League pennant. NBC decided to focus on its baseball coverage instead of covering the early AFL games, thus resulting in Curt Gowdy calling the Twins-Red Sox game and Jim Simpson calling the Angels-Tigers game), while the AFL schedule resulted in the two early games (Broncos-Oilers and Dolphins-Jets not being televised with another one, Chargers-Bills being a locally televised game airing only in San Diego on then-NBC affiliate KOGO (now ABC affiliate KGTV).

=== The Heidi Game ===
One of the most remembered games on NBC was a 1968 game known as the Heidi Game on November 17, 1968. As its nationally televised game between the Oakland Raiders and New York Jets running late, the network discontinued coverage while the game was still playing to air the movie Heidi just moments after the Jets' Jim Turner kicked what appeared to be the game-winning field goal with 1:05 remaining. While millions of irate fans, missing the finale, jammed NBC's phone lines, the Raiders scored two touchdowns in eight seconds during the final minute to win 43–32.

The reaction to The Heidi Game resulted in the AFL, and most other sports leagues, demanding thereafter that television networks broadcast all games to their conclusion. NFL contracts with the networks now require games to be shown in a team's market area to conclusion, regardless of the score.

To avoid a repeat incident, a 1975 NBC broadcast of Willy Wonka & the Chocolate Factory was delayed until the completion of a Washington Redskins–Raiders game. The network installed a new phone in the control room wired to a separate exchange, becoming known as the Heidi Phone, to prevent this situation from occurring in the future.

=== AFL–NFL merger ===
With the contract with NBC and the increased, heated battle over college prospects, both the AFL and NBC negotiated a merger agreement on June 8, 1966. Although they would not officially fully merge and adopt an interlocking schedule until 1970, two of the conditions of the agreement were that the winners of each league's championship game would meet in a contest (which would eventually become known as the Super Bowl) to determine the "world champion of football", and that there would be a common player draft.

NBC would continuously carry the AFL/AFC's Sunday afternoon games from 1965 through the 1997 season, after which NBC lost the AFC contract to CBS.

== List of commentators ==
Curt Gowdy, who had covered the first five seasons of the American Football League with broadcast partner Paul Christman on ABC, moved over to NBC in the fall of 1965. For the next decade, Gowdy was the lead play-by-play announcer for the network for both AFL football (AFC from 1970 onward) and Major League Baseball games; however, Gowdy also covered a wide range of sports, earning him the nickname of the "broadcaster of everything." Besides Paul Christman, Curt Gowdy's other football broadcast partners were Kyle Rote, Al DeRogatis, Don Meredith, John Brodie and Merlin Olsen.

The trio of Curt Gowdy, Kyle Rote and Al DeRogatis would each also handle two games in Week 1 of the 1968 AFL season. All three teamed to call the Cincinnati-San Diego game on Thursday night. DeRogatis would team with Charlie Jones for the Boston-Buffalo game on Saturday, and Gowdy and Rote would call the Kansas City-Houston game on Sunday. The trio would also broadcast Super Bowl III. Late in the season, there were a number of double-duty weeks by announcers. In Week 14, Jim Simpson and DeRogatis called the Buffalo-Houston game on Saturday, then the following day Simpson called the Denver-Oakland game while DeRogatis called the Cincinnati-New York Jets game. The following week, DeRogatis again pulled double-duty, calling the Kansas City-Denver game on Saturday (with Charlie Jones), then joining Jim Simpson for the Oakland-San Diego game the next day. Jones called the Boston-Houston game with George Ratterman also that week. Al DeRogatis called "The Heidi Game" with Curt Gowdy in Week 11 (Rote joined Jim Simpson for the San Diego-Buffalo game). Charlie Jones substituted for Gowdy in Week 5 (Boston-Oakland), while Gowdy called Game 4 of the 1968 World Series.

Charlie Jones substituted for Curt Gowdy during Week 5 of the 1969 season (New York Jets-Cincinnati), while Gowdy called Game 2 of the World Series. Al DeRogatis substituted for Kyle Rote in Weeks 9 (San Diego-Kansas City) and 11 (Oakland-Kansas City). Rote paired with Jim Simpson in both instances. And with 1969 being the final AFL season before the AFL–NFL merger, this was also the final season where both leagues would have Thanksgiving doubleheaders. Starting in 1970, only two games would be played on Thanksgiving, with the Lions and Cowboys hosting those games, and an AFC team rotating as the visiting team between Detroit and Dallas every year.

As previously mentioned, in 1970, after the NFL and AFL completed their merger, NBC signed a contract with the league to broadcast games from the American Football Conference (AFC). After this season, Al DeRogatis and Kyle Rote swapped positions; resulting in DeRogatis being the #1 color commentator alongside Curt Gowdy and Rote being the #2 analyst alongside Jim Simpson.

=== Play-by-play ===
- Lou Boda
- Herb Carneal
- Len Dillon
- Bill Enis
- Curt Gowdy
- Charlie Jones
- Bill Mazer
- Bill O'Donnell
- Jay Randolph
- Jim Simpson

=== Color commentary ===
- Elmer Angsman
- Chris Burford
- Paul Christman
- Al DeRogatis
- Lee Grosscup
- Dave Kocourek
- George Ratterman
- Andy Robustelli
- Kyle Rote
