= American Football League All-Star game =

Annual all-star game

Program for the 3rd Annual AFL All-Star Game, held in San Diego.

The American Football League All-Star game was the annual game which featured each year's best performers in the American Football League (AFL). The game was first played in 1961 and the final AFL All-Star game occurred in 1969, prior to the league's merger with the National Football League (NFL).

== All-League Teams ==
The Sporting News published American Football League All-League Teams for each season played by the American Football League, 1960 through 1969. From 1960 through 1966, the All-League Team was selected by the AFL players, and from 1967 through 1969 it was selected by a consensus of The Sporting News (TSN), the Associated Press (AP), United Press International (UPI), and the Newspaper Enterprise Association (NEA). The All-League AFL selections usually included one player at each team position on offense and on defense (i.e., one quarterback, two guards, four defensive backs, etc.). Eastern All-Stars wore red uniforms with a white top and red stars, with the colors reversed for away, while Western All-Stars wore blue uniforms with a white top and blue stars and vice versa for away. Each player wore their team's respective helmet, and unlike their regular team uniforms, all star uniforms never featured names on the back.

== All-Star teams ==
The AFL did not have an all-star game after its first season in 1960 but from 1961 through 1969, other AFL players were added to the All-League players to form two squads, and the league held All-Star games for those seasons. After every season except 1965, the format consisted of games between All-Star teams from the Eastern and Western divisions. In 1965, the league champion Buffalo Bills played all-stars from the other teams.

The Pro Football Hall of Fame and the NFL include AFL All-Star games in their statistics for the Pro Bowl. After the AFL–NFL merger of 1970, the name of the NFL's all-star game was changed to the AFC-NFC Pro Bowl. Six days after Super Bowl IV, Buffalo Bills rookie running back O.J. Simpson carried the ball on the last play in AFL history in the Astrodome (in Houston, Texas) at the All-Star game on January 17, 1970.

== The 1965 boycott ==
After the 1964 season, the AFL All-Star game had been scheduled for early 1965 in New Orleans' Tulane Stadium. After numerous black players were refused service by a number of New Orleans hotels and businesses, black and white players alike lobbied for a boycott. The black players all left days before the game, saying that it was clear they were not wanted. Under the leadership of Buffalo Bills players including Cookie Gilchrist and other players such as Clem Daniels, the players put up a unified front, and the game was successfully moved to Houston's Jeppesen Stadium.

== Game history ==
Season	Date	Score	Series	Most Valuable Player(s)	Venue	Attendance	Head Coaches	Television
1961	January 7, 1962	West, 47–27	West 1–0	Cotton Davidson, QB, Texans	Balboa Stadium, San Diego	20,973	Eastern: Wally Lemm (Houston); Western: Sid Gillman (San Diego)	ABC
1962	January 13, 1963	West, 21–14	West 2–0	Offense: Curtis McClinton, RB, Dallas Texans; Defense: Earl Faison, DE, Chargers	Balboa Stadium, San Diego	27,641	Eastern: Frank Ivy (Houston); W:Hank Stram (Dallas)	ABC
1963	January 19, 1964	West, 27–24	West 3–0	Offense: Keith Lincoln, RB, Chargers; Defense: Archie Matsos, LB, Raiders	Balboa Stadium, San Diego	20,016	Eastern: Mike Holovak (Boston); Western: Sid Gillman (San Diego)	ABC
1964	January 16, 1965	West, 38–14	West 4–0	Offense: Keith Lincoln, RB, Chargers; Defense: Willie Brown, DB, Broncos	Jeppesen Stadium, Houston, Texas	15,446	Eastern: Lou Saban (Buffalo); Western: Sid Gillman (San Diego)	ABC
1965	January 15, 1966	AFL All-Stars 30, Buffalo Bills 19	-	Offense: Joe Namath, QB, Jets; Defense: Frank Buncom, LB, Chargers	Rice Stadium, Houston	35,572	Buffalo: Lou Saban; All-Stars: Sid Gillman (San Diego)	NBC
1966	January 21, 1967	East, 30–23	West 4–1	Offense: Babe Parilli, QB, Boston Patriots; Defense: Verlon Biggs, DE, Jets	Oakland–Alameda County Coliseum, Oakland, California	18,876	Eastern: Mike Holovak (Boston); Western: John Rauch (Oakland)	NBC
1967	January 21, 1968	East, 25–24	West 4–2	Offense: Joe Namath, QB, Jets; and Don Maynard, F, Jets; Defense: Speedy Duncan, DB/KR, Chargers	Gator Bowl, Jacksonville, Florida	40,103	Eastern: Joe Collier (Buffalo); Western: Lou Saban (Denver)	NBC
1968	January 19, 1969	West, 38–25	West 5–2	Offense: Len Dawson, QB, Chiefs; Defense: George Webster, LB, Houston Oilers	Gator Bowl, Jacksonville, Florida	41,058	Eastern: George Wilson (Miami); Western: Lou Saban (Denver)	NBC
1969	January 17, 1970	West, 26–3	West 6–2	John Hadl, QB, Chargers	Astrodome, Houston	30,170	Eastern: George Wilson (Miami); Western: Lou Saban (Denver)	NBC

== Broadcasters ==
The following is a list of the television networks and announcers that broadcast the American Football League All-Star game during its existence.

Season	Network	Play-by-play	Color commentator(s)	Sideline reporter(s)
1961	ABC	Jack Buck	Jim McKay	George Ratterman
1962	ABC	Curt Gowdy	Paul Christman and George Ratterman	
1963	ABC	Curt Gowdy	Paul Christman	
1964	ABC	Curt Gowdy	Paul Christman and George Ratterman	
1965	NBC	Curt Gowdy	Paul Christman	Charlie Jones
1966	NBC	Curt Gowdy	Paul Christman	Charlie Jones
1967	NBC	Curt Gowdy	Paul Christman	
1968	NBC	Curt Gowdy	Kyle Rote	Charlie Jones
1969	NBC	Charlie Jones	Al DeRogatis	

== See also ==
- Pro Bowl
- List of American Football League players
