= NFL on television in the 2020s =

From 2014 to 2022, CBS, NBC, and Fox, as well as cable television's ESPN, paid a combined total of US$20.4 billion will pay $39.6 billion for exactly the same broadcast rights. The NFL thus holds broadcast contracts with four companies (Skydance, Comcast, Fox Corporation and The Walt Disney Company/Hearst Corporation, respectively) that control a combined vast majority of the country's television product. League-owned NFL Network, on cable television, also broadcasts a selected number of games nationally. In 2017, the NFL games attracted the top three rates for a 30-second advertisement: $699,602 for NBC Sunday Night Football, $550,709 for Thursday Night Football (NBC), and $549,791 for Thursday Night Football (CBS).

Under the current contracts since 2023, regionally shown games on Sunday afternoons are televised on CBS and Fox, which primarily carry games of AFC and NFC teams respectively (the conference of the away team generally determines the broadcaster of an inter-conference game). Nationally televised regular season games on Sunday and Monday nights currently airing on NBC and ESPN/ABC, respectively, while Amazon Prime Video Nationally televise Thursday night games during the regular season. In addition, a "flexible scheduling" policy allows the league to reschedule Sunday afternoon and night games to different time slots and/or reassign them to different networks regardless of conference (Monday and Thursday Night games are subject to this policy but must give 12 and 28 days notice respectively). During the postseason, ESPN airs two games, NBC airs two, while CBS and Fox air three games in their respective conference each year, all networks air one game in each of the first two rounds then the conference championship round is split between Fox and CBS respectively, an extra wild card game (of either conference) goes in rotation between CBS, Fox and NBC, with another wild card game going up for sale with Prime Video holding rights to this streaming exclusive for most years. The Super Bowl has rotated annually among CBS, Fox, NBC and ESPN since the 2023 season.

On April 29, 2020, Amazon renewed its digital rights through the 2022 season, maintaining the TNF simulcasts and digital content, and also adding exclusive international rights to one late-season game per-season outside of the package (which will be produced by CBS). For its simulcasts, Amazon replaced the British feed with a new "Scout's Feed" with extended analysis by Bucky Brooks and Daniel Jeremiah (akin to the ESPN "film room" broadcasts of college football games), and "NFL Next Live" on Twitch (with viewer interactivity).

On March 13, 2021, the league announced a new agreement with ESPN/ABC, CBS, Fox, and NBC that will run from 2023 to 2033, which increases those broadcaster's digital rights, expands "flexible scheduling", and adds ABC/ESPN to the Super Bowl rotation, among others.

== Year-by-year breakdown ==
=== 2020 ===
During Super Bowl LIV, Fox introduced a new on-air appearance specific to its football broadcasts, replacing the previous rectangular appearance with a slanted motif. The scoreboard was also changed to a box-like appearance in the bottom-center, showing only team logos, and with both teams positioned in opposing directions. Translucent strips are used to show quarterback statistics following each play. Selected players are depicted in graphics using stylized "cartoon" illustrations rather than traditional photos, and during the Super Bowl, lower thirds incorporated fonts based on the teams' respective wordmarks. These graphics took effect full-time for football telecasts on Fox after the Super Bowl, including the XFL, and the subsequent NFL and college football seasons.

==== Preseason ====
In the 2020 offseason, the NFL queried its teams on the possibility of expanding flexible scheduling to Monday Night Football. No consensus was achieved on whether or not such an expansion would be viable, as travel and lodging reservations are set in advance and would require visiting teams to book hotels for an extra day because of the uncertainty such a flex option would entail. Flexible scheduling would not take effect until Monday Night Football's next contract begins in 2023.

The 2020 schedule was released on May 7. The Kickoff game was on September 10, which featured the Super Bowl LIV Champion Kansas City Chiefs hosting the Houston Texans. The Thanksgiving Night game was supposed to feature the Baltimore Ravens versus the Pittsburgh Steelers; the ninth time that the Thanksgiving game would have been part of the SNF package shown on NBC. A COVID-19 outbreak on the Baltimore Ravens forced the postponement of the game to the following Sunday afternoon, which was then postponed to the following Tuesday night, and then finally to Wednesday afternoon. It was shown on NBC as scheduled, but KWQC-TV - the NBC affiliate for the Quad Cities of Iowa and Illinois - opted not to show the game. Before this occasion, the last Wednesday night game played in the NFL was also a special edition of primetime on NBC - the 2012 Kickoff game between the Dallas Cowboys and New York Giants that was scheduled as such to avoid a conflict with Obama's renomination speech at that year's Democratic National Convention.

The 2020 season saw another major revamp to ESPN's booth, with Steve Levy, Brian Griese, and Louis Riddick, joining holdovers Lisa Salters and John Parry. ESPN's lead college football commentary team of Chris Fowler, Kirk Herbstreit, and Maria Taylor called the first game of the Week 1 doubleheader (as Fowler and Taylor were already in the New York area handling the US Open and NBA Finals respectively). To formally celebrate the 50th anniversary of Monday Night Football, the Las Vegas Raiders' Week 2 home opener (their first after relocating from Oakland) was simulcast by ABC. A special “Monday Night Megacast” was also produced and aired on ESPN2, with Rece Davis and Kirk Herbstreit providing commentary and interviews with multiple guests throughout the game. The Hank Williams Jr. MNF theme was once again dropped, being replaced by a cover of Little Richard's "Rip It Up" by Virginia-based band Butcher Brown.

Weeks before the 2020 season, Fox dropped Thom Brennaman following the controversy surrounding his use of a homophobic slur while working as the television voice of the Cincinnati Reds. Kevin Kugler took over Brennaman's slot on the #5 team with Chris Spielman. With Charles Davis departing for CBS, his position at the #2 team with Kevin Burkhardt was filled by Daryl Johnston, who in turn was replaced by Brock Huard and Greg Jennings on the #6 team with Chris Myers. Adam Amin replaced Dick Stockton on the now-promoted #3 pairing with Mark Schlereth, though Stockton would continue to call select games when necessary. Jonathan Vilma replaced Ronde Barber on the #4 team with Kenny Albert. Spielman left Fox after Week 14 to join the Detroit Lions front office. Huard took over Spielman's place with Kugler.

==== Effects from the COVID-19 pandemic ====
In 2020, because of numerous pandemic-related issues that led to CBS losing a 1 PM (Pittsburgh vs Tennessee) and a 4:25 PM (New England at Kansas City) game during Week 4, the NFL used the flexible schedule rule to move Indianapolis at Chicago from 1 PM to 4:25 PM.

Initially, ESPN had an opportunity to air a second MNF doubleheader when the Broncos–Patriots game, originally scheduled on October 4, was postponed to October 12 due to a player testing positive for Coronavirus disease 2019 (COVID-19), The game would have been scheduled for a 5:00 p.m. ET kickoff with Fowler and Herbstreit working the game. However, additional positive tests from New England forced the NFL to reschedule the game to October 18, along with a slew of other rescheduled games involving the Dolphins, Jets, Chargers and Jaguars.

Following Cam Newton's positive COVID-19 test, the New England Patriots-Kansas City Chiefs game, originally scheduled for Sunday afternoon, was postponed to Monday, October 5 at 7:05 p.m. ET to be broadcast nationally. This will be CBS's first Monday night telecast since November 24, 2014. The Kansas City Chiefs won 26–10.

On October 13, due to multiple positive COVID-19 in the Tennessee Titans organization, the Titans-Buffalo Bills game was moved to Tuesday, which was the seventh Tuesday NFL game in history. The Titans ultimately won the game 42–16.

On October 19, because of a COVID-19 outbreak involving the Tennessee Titans, the originally scheduled Thursday night game between the Chiefs and Bills, was moved to the following Monday due to Tennessee playing Buffalo the previous Tuesday. The Chiefs won 26–17. In a similar move, the Ravens had their scheduled Week 13 TNF game against the Cowboys postponed to the following Tuesday. The Ravens had dealt with their own outbreak, which included positive tests from players including reigning MVP Lamar Jackson. For that reason, the Ravens had to postpone their Thanksgiving game against the Steelers three times, the first time was originally postponed to the Sunday after Thanksgiving in the afternoon, then postponed a second time to the following Tuesday night, then postponed again to the following Wednesday in the afternoon. The postponements forced the Steelers’ Week 13 game against the Washington Football Team to be moved from Sunday, December 6, to Monday, December 7, and as mentioned, the Cowboys-Ravens game a day later, with both games remaining on Fox.

Mike Tirico substituted for Al Michaels on a select number of games on NBC this season, that started with the September 27 game between the Green Bay Packers and the New Orleans Saints. Tirico was initially slated to call the Thanksgiving game this season, but was assigned instead to call the Week 12 SNF game between the Packers and the Chicago Bears with Tony Dungy and Kathryn Tappen. Tirico was eventually given the assignment to call the rescheduled Ravens–Steelers game with Collinsworth after it was postponed from Sunday afternoon to Wednesday night. Tirico also called one of NBC's two wild card playoff games in January.

The aforementioned Packers–Saints game took place while the 2020 Stanley Cup Finals (rescheduled from its normal late May–early June schedule) were ongoing; Dallas (Stars) and Tampa Bay (Lightning) also have NFL teams in the Cowboys and Buccaneers. As NBC was also the rightsholder to National Hockey League games in the U.S., the league was compelled to play Games 4 and 5 (September 25–26) of the finals on consecutive nights to avoid conflict with SNF.

For the first time in the history of SNF, NBC aired games against an NBA Finals game in back-to-back weeks; this is usually a non-issue as the NBA Finals traditionally take place in June but was moved to the fall due to the NBA suspending their season. This occurred on October 4 with the Eagles playing the 49ers on the same day as Game 3, and on October 11, with the Vikings playing the Seahawks on the same day as Game 6 (the eventual last game of the series). Although Philadelphia, San Francisco, and Minnesota all have NBA teams, only the 76ers qualified for the playoffs, although they were eliminated in the first round. The Los Angeles Lakers defeated the Miami Heat in six games.

==== Flexible scheduling ====
Flexible scheduling rules went into effect in Week 5; the scheduled game reverted to the afternoon if a more compelling game arose. The scheduled SNF game could be swapped with the more competitive game's time slot. The final game of the season, on Sunday, January 3, 2021, likewise was a flex game. The slot, purposefully left blank when the schedule came out, was filled by the game between Washington and the home team Philadelphia Eagles. A Washington win gave them the NFC East Division title.

==== Postseason ====
Super Bowl LV was televised by CBS. Although NBC was to air this game under the current rotation, they traded with CBS for Super Bowl LVI, which falls during the 2022 Winter Olympics and is the first to be scheduled during an ongoing Olympic Games (this also upholds the untold gentleman's agreement between the NFL's broadcasters to not counterprogram the Super Bowl, as NBC also holds the U.S. broadcast rights to the Olympics).

CBS also gained rights to air a second Wild Card game, as the NFL expanded its postseason from 12 to 14 teams (7 in each conference). As part of gaining the rights to air the second game, which was played on January 10 at 4:40 ET, CBS's sister network Nickelodeon also aired a self-produced broadcast of the game, in an effort to promote a younger audience.

CBS will air two Wild Card games and one AFC Divisional game in odd-numbered years, two Wild Card games and both AFC Divisional games in even-numbered years, the AFC Championship Game (in the afternoon in even-numbered years, primetime in odd-numbered years), and the Super Bowl every three years.

In October 2020, Amazon acquired rights to simulcast one of CBS's NFC Wild Card games on Amazon Prime Video, as part of its digital rights to the league (expanding upon its involvement with Thursday Night Football).

ABC, ESPN, and Disney XD aired a television special in place of the 2021 Pro Bowl—the Pro Bowl Celebration—which would feature segments and interviews honoring the Pro Bowl roster, and highlights of the 2020 season, and promoting the digital Pro Bowl event.

=== 2021 ===
ESPN's rights to Monday Night Football were modified in 2021, allowing ABC to simulcast select games (Weeks 1, 14, and 15), as well as a new Saturday doubleheader in Week 18.

On March 18, the NFL announced its future television deals for 2023–2033 (see below).

ESPN announced an agreement with Omaha Productions, the production company of Peyton Manning, to produce Monday Night Football with Peyton and Eli, a supplemental telecast of Monday Night Football with Manning, his brother Eli, and guest celebrities for ten games each season on ESPN2 and ESPN+, from 2021 to 2023.

The wild card playoff game aired by ESPN and ABC was moved from Saturday to Monday night, with a Peyton and Eli broadcast on ESPN2 and ESPN+ providing the “Peyton and Eli” broadcast.

For the second consecutive season, Nickelodeon simulcast a wild-card playoff game with CBS, using the same youth-friendly broadcast modifications that were in place the previous season. Nickelodeon will also air a weekly NFL magazine program, NFL Slimetime, throughout the season.

NBC televised Super Bowl LVI along with Telemundo Deportes which aired its first Super Bowl in Spanish on broadcast television. Due to NBC's coverage of the 2020 Summer Olympics (held 2021), the network sold its broadcast rights to the Pro Football Hall of Fame Game to Fox.

=== 2022 ===
Following the expiration of their eight-year contract, ESPN and ABC agreed to a one-year bridge contract. As with the previous season, ESPN will hold rights to a Saturday doubleheader during the final week of the season, simulcast with ABC. Beginning this season, ESPN+ will exclusively carry one International Series game per season. ABC will also air its first exclusive game since 2005 on September 19, as part of a doubleheader with ESPN.

This will be the first year in which Thursday Night Football will exclusively stream on Amazon Prime Video and Twitch. Fox and NFL Network opted out of their final season of the 2018–2022 TNF deal, allowing Amazon to take over one season before its 2023–2033 TNF agreement was to go into effect. The start time for Thursday Night games was moved from 8:20 pm ET to 8:15 pm ET to allow Prime Video to conclude its coverage earlier.

This will be the final season under DirecTV's deal for exclusive rights to the NFL Sunday Ticket out-of-market sports package. DirecTV has held exclusive rights since the package's launch in 1994. DirecTV executives have questioned the current value of NFL Sunday Ticket after losing money over the past few years. In September 2021, NFL Commissioner Roger Goodell suggested that NFL Sunday Ticket could be more attractive on a digital platform. In June, it was reported that Disney, Apple, and Amazon submitted bids. In July, Google submitted a bid.

The NFL's mobile streaming contract with Verizon expired following the 2021 season (which included mobile streaming of live local and nationally televised games along with cellular streaming of NFL Network); it was reported that the league was preparing to move these rights behind a paywall of an in-house subscription service. In July, the NFL announced that NFL Game Pass would be replaced in the United States by NFL+, which will stream in-market games on mobile devices only, radio broadcasts for all games, most out-of-market preseason games, as well as on-demand programming from NFL Network and NFL Films. A premium tier of the service adds on-demand game replays and other viewing options while the cellular streaming of NFL Network was paywalled behind a pay TV provider.

==== Personnel changes ====
On March 16, ESPN signed Joe Buck and Troy Aikman — who were Fox's lead commentary team for 20 seasons — to a multi-year deal to become the new lead commentators of Monday Night Football. ESPN's previous MNF broadcasters Steve Levy and Louis Riddick continued as ESPN's secondary NFL broadcast team, with Dan Orlovsky replacing Brian Griese who left ESPN for a coaching job with San Francisco.

On March 23, Amazon announced that longtime NBC play-by-play announcer Al Michaels and ESPN college football analyst Kirk Herbstreit would serve as its lead broadcast team for Thursday Night Football. Amazon later added ABC News reporter Kaylee Hartung as its sideline reporter. Mike Tirico—who had been NBC's secondary play-by-play announcer and Michaels' designated fill-in since joining NBC in 2016—succeeded Michaels as the lead commentator for Sunday Night Football, with Maria Taylor succeeding him as lead studio host and Jason Garrett replacing Drew Brees on the Football Night in America panel. Melissa Stark replaced Michele Tafoya as sideline reporter. Amazon's studio panel will be led by Fox's Charissa Thompson, with analysts Tony Gonzalez, Ryan Fitzpatrick, Richard Sherman, and Andrew Whitworth. Bleacher Report and Turner Sports' Taylor Rooks and NBC's Michael Smith also made contributions.

With Buck and Aikman's departure, Fox's number-2 commentary team of Kevin Burkhardt and Greg Olsen were promoted to Fox's top pairing. Replacing Burkhardt and Olsen were Joe Davis and Daryl Johnston, starting his third stint as Fox's number 2 analyst. Kristina Pink, who was one of Fox's two TNF reporters from 2018 to 2021, returned to Sunday reporting duties to join the team of Adam Amin and Mark Schlereth. Robert Smith also moved from Fox's college football coverage to join Chris Myers.

=== 2023 ===
On March 13, 2021, the league announced a new agreement with ESPN/ABC, CBS, Fox, and NBC that will run from 2023 to 2033, worth over $110B ($10B/year). Among the new changes:

- One game will exclusively be on Peacock for six seasons.
- Flexible scheduling will be expanded to include Monday Night Football and Thursday Night Football.
- The amount of "cross-flexing" between CBS and Fox will increase. Under the new system, CBS and Fox will be able to protect a limited number of games involving a specific number of teams from their respective conference.
- ABC/ESPN will be added to the Super Bowl rotation.
- The four broadcasters will now each air one divisional playoff game per season, with ABC/ESPN taking over the slot that was previously rotated annually between CBS and Fox.

== See also ==
- NFL on television
- History of the NFL on television
- List of NFL Championship Game broadcasters
- List of Super Bowl broadcasters
- History of Monday Night Football
