= American Football League on ABC =

- Also known as: AFL on ABC
- Genre: AFL game telecasts
- Presented by: See list of commentators
- Country of origin: United States
- Original language: English
- No. of seasons: 5

Production
- Production locations: Various AFL stadiums (game telecasts)
- Camera setup: Multi-camera
- Running time: 210 minutes or until game ends
- Production company: ABC Sports

Original release
- Network: ABC
- Release: September 11, 1960 – January 16, 1965

Related
- American Football League on NBC; NFL on ABC

American Football League (AFL) on ABC was a television program that broadcast professional football games of the then fledgling (when compared to the more established National Football League) American Football League on the American Broadcasting Company (ABC), then itself a less established player in American network television. ABC broadcast AFL games from the league's first season in 1960 until the 1964 season, when NBC took over as the league's primary network television broadcaster.

== Broadcast history ==
=== Terms of the deal ===
On June 9, 1960, the league signed a five-year television contract with ABC, which brought in revenues of approximately $2,125,000 per year for the entire league. The deal called for ABC to broadcast approximately 37 regular season games, the AFL Championship Game and the AFL All-Star Game. These games were typically broadcast regionally on 15 consecutive Sundays and on Thanksgiving Day. This became the first ever cooperative television plan for professional football, in which the proceeds of the contract were divided equally among member clubs; the National Football League would follow suit in 1961, a move that required Congress to pass the Sports Broadcasting Act of 1961 to accommodate such collective broadcasting contracts.

=== Innovations ===
ABC and the AFL also introduced moving, on-field cameras (as opposed to the fixed midfield cameras of CBS and the NFL), and were the first to have players "miked" during broadcast games. As the AFL also had players' names stitched on their jerseys, it was easier for both television viewers and people at the games to tell who was who.

=== The end of ABC's involvement ===
The last AFL game on ABC television was the All-Star Game on January 16, 1965; rights were sold in January 1964 to NBC for $36 million over five years, beginning with the 1965 season. This infusion of cash helped spur a bidding war for talent with the NFL, which led to the AFL–NFL merger agreement in June 1966. With the exception of the 1966 Continental Football League championship, ABC did not carry pro football again until after the completion of the merger and the subsequent creation of Monday Night Football for the 1970 season.

== List of commentators ==
Pat Hernon hosted ABC's national postgame show out of New York. While ABC did show scores and updates from both the AFL and NFL, seldom if ever did viewers see any actual AFL highlights except from the game that had just been broadcast in their region, or nationally. They however, never showed any actual NFL highlights whatsoever.

=== Play-by-play ===
- Charlie Brockman (1964)
- Jack Buck (1960-1963)
- John Ferguson (1960)
- Bill Flemming (1964)
- Curt Gowdy (1962-1964)
- Keith Jackson (1964)
- Charlie Jones (1960-1964)
- Les Keiter (1960)
- Bob Neal (1961)

=== Color commentary ===
- Elmer Angsman (1960; 1964)
- Fred Benners (1960)
- Paul Christman (1962-1964)
- Dick Danehe (1960)
- Bill Dudley (1960)
- Lee Giroux (1961)
- Johnny Lujack (1964)
- Paul Mannaseh (1960)
- Jim McKay (1961)
- George Ratterman (1960-1964)

== See also ==
- NFL on ABC
- History of the NFL on television
  - NFL on American television
