= History of the NFL on television =

The history of the National Football League on television documents the long history of the National Football League on television. The NFL, along with boxing and professional wrestling (before the latter publicly became known as a "fake" sport), was a pioneer of sports broadcasting during a time when baseball and college football were more popular than professional football. Due to the NFL understanding television at an earlier time, they were able to surpass Major League Baseball in the 1960s as the most popular sport in the United States. Today, NFL broadcasting contracts are among the most valuable in the world.

== From infancy to national success ==
NBC was the first major television network to cover an NFL game, when on October 22, 1939, it broadcast a game between the Philadelphia Eagles and the Brooklyn Dodgers; the network was still only in its infancy, with only two affiliates, the modern day WRGB (now a CBS affiliate) in Schenectady and W2XBS in New York City. Portions of that game still survive via films, but the film is not footage from the telecast (recordings of television broadcasts did not begin until 1948). The use of a sideline camera, the sole camera used in the 1939 broadcast, would become the standard for all future NFL broadcasts until 2017; the angle is particularly suited for estimating yardage, compared to more mobile camera angles that began to appear in the 21st century.

Regular broadcasts of games began after World War II and the first NFL championship to be televised was the 1948 match between the Eagles and Chicago Cardinals.

In 1950, the Los Angeles Rams and the Washington Redskins became the first NFL teams to have all of their games—home and away—televised. In the same year, other teams made deals to have selected games telecast. The DuMont Network then paid a rights fee of US$75,000 to broadcast the 1951 NFL Championship Game across the entire nation.

From 1953 to 1955, DuMont also televised Saturday night NFL games. It was the first time that NFL fixtures were broadcast live, coast-to-coast, in prime time, for the entire season. The broadcasts ended after the 1955 season, when the DuMont Network folded. DuMont was a less than ideal partner for NFL broadcasts: with only eighteen affiliates in 1954, it was dwarfed by the amount of coverage the "Big Four" (later the East Division of the Canadian Football League) had with its contract on NBC, which had 120 affiliates at the time.

DuMont also had Sunday regional coverage alongside ABC, in both instances the games being negotiated by the teams as opposed to the league as a whole. DuMont focused on teams that played in markets that had one of the network's O&O's and offered regional coverage of the New York Giants (WABD, now WNYW), Pittsburgh Steelers (WDTV, now KDKA-TV), and Washington Redskins (WTTG). ABC opted to go by region, initially offering the Chicago Bears and Chicago Cardinals nationally before relegating them to mostly Midwestern markets while offering the Los Angeles Rams and San Francisco 49ers for Western markets and the Redskins for Eastern and Southern markets; DuMont replaced the Redskins with the Philadelphia Eagles in its rotation.

By 1955, DuMont was in terminal decline following a merger attempt with ABC being vetoed by DuMont shareholder Paramount Pictures out of antitrust concerns (Paramount had spun off United Paramount Theaters by order of the United States Department of Justice, with UPT subsequently buying ABC) and selling off WDTV to Westinghouse Broadcasting. This led to the 1955 NFL season having erratic broadcasting contracts, with the Giants, Eagles, & Steelers remaining on DuMont, the Bears, Cardinals, Rams, & 49ers remaining on ABC, the Cleveland Browns (one of the league's most successful and popular teams) and Redskins (the only team at the time representing the South) having their own regionalized coverage, and the Baltimore Colts (who despite also geographically being in the South represented the more Northeastern-like Baltimore) and Detroit Lions (despite the presence of then-ABC O&O WXYZ-TV) restricted to their home markets. The Green Bay Packers had no local television coverage, due to playing in both the smallest market in the major professional sports leagues.

Later in 1955, NBC became the televised home of the NFL Championship Game, paying $100,000 to the league. The 1958 NFL Championship Game played at Yankee Stadium between the Baltimore Colts and the New York Giants went into sudden death overtime. This game, since dubbed the "Greatest Game Ever Played," was watched widely throughout the country and is credited with increasing the popularity of professional football in the late 1950s and early 1960s.

CBS began to televise selected NFL regular season games in 1956. That same year the rights fee for the 1956 NFL Championship Game rose to an unprecedented $200,000.

By 1959, big-market teams such as the Bears and Giants had all their games televised, but small-market ones like the Packers and 49ers still did not. Upon becoming NFL commissioner, Pete Rozelle worked to ensure that every team got all its games on TV.

== War with the AFL ==
When the rival American Football League (AFL) began in 1960, it signed a 5-year television contract with ABC. This became the first cooperative television plan for professional football, through which the proceeds of the contract were divided equally among member clubs. ABC and the AFL also introduced moving, on-field cameras (as opposed to the fixed midfield cameras of CBS and the NFL), and were the first to have players "miked" during broadcast games. As the AFL also had players' names stitched on their jerseys, it was easier for both TV viewers and people at the games to tell who was who.

As of the 1961 season, CBS held the rights to all but one of the NFL's teams; the Cleveland Browns had a separate contract with Sports Network Incorporated (SNI) to carry their games over a regional network. However, the Browns and SNI were forced to break their deal when the NFL and CBS devised their own revenue sharing plan after CBS agreed to telecast all regular season games for an annual fee of $4.65 million. A special antitrust exemption, the Sports Broadcasting Act of 1961, was passed in Congress to accommodate the collective contract, which restricted what days the league could televise their games. CBS' fee later increased to $14.1 million per year in 1964, and $18.8 million per year in 1966.

With NBC paying the AFL $36 million in 1965 to televise its games, and the intensified battle over college prospects, both leagues negotiated a merger agreement on June 8, 1966. Although they would not officially merge into one combined league until 1970, one of the conditions of the agreement was that the winners of each league's championship game would meet in a contest to determine the "world champion of football."

The first AFL-NFL World Championship Game was played on January 15, 1967 between the NFL champion Packers and the AFL champion Chiefs. As CBS held the rights to nationally televise NFL games and NBC had the rights to broadcast AFL matches, it was decided that both would cover that first game. The next three AFL-NFL World Championship Games, the initial Super Bowls, were then divided by the two networks: CBS broadcast Super Bowls II and IV while NBC covered III.

== Post AFL–NFL Merger ==
When the AFL and the NFL officially merged in 1970, the combined league divided its teams into the American Football Conference (AFC) and the National Football Conference (NFC). It was then decided that CBS would televise all NFC teams (including playoff games) while NBC would be responsible for all AFC teams. For interconference games, CBS would broadcast them if the visiting team was from the NFC, and NBC if the visitors were from the AFC. The two networks had a rotation policy for the Super Bowl.

ABC also agreed to televise one regular season game per week on Monday night. ABC aired its first edition of Monday Night Football on September 21, 1970. MNF pushed the limits of football coverage with its halftime highlights segment, occasional banter from Howard Cosell and Don Meredith, and celebrity guests such as John Lennon, Arnold Schwarzenegger and Bill Clinton. During its 36-year run on ABC, Monday Night Football consistently ranked among the most popular prime time broadcasts each week during the season.

As the league's broadcasters, ABC, CBS, and NBC had their own talent. Announcers such as Cosell, Frank Gifford, and Al Michaels (from ABC); Pat Summerall and John Madden (from CBS); and Curt Gowdy, Dick Enberg, Marv Albert, Jim Simpson, Kyle Rote and Jim Lampley (from NBC), all had their own unique analysis of the game. Individual networks had distinctive innovations in their coverage. For example, CBS' The NFL Today was the first pre-game show to have a female co-host (Phyllis George). On December 20, 1980 NBC made history by broadcasting a game between the New York Jets and Miami Dolphins with no announcers. NBC has also tried one-announcer football when Dick Enberg called the New York Jets' visit to Cleveland Browns on December 12, 1981 without his regular colleague Merlin Olsen in accompaniment. NBC instead pre-recorded interviews with players and coaches from both teams which filled in the parts where Olsen would have spoken.

On December 27, 1987, NBC introduced the first female play-by-play football announcer in Gayle Sierens, who partnered with Dave Rowe in a game between the Seattle Seahawks and Kansas City Chiefs; contractual issues with her main employer prevented Sierens from calling any further games for the network, and it would be another 29 seasons before the next female announcer, Beth Mowins, began calling games for both ESPN and CBS in 2017.

In 1978, the NFL increased its revenue from both ticket sales and TV by expanding the regular season from 14 games to 16. Furthermore, the playoff format was expanded from 8 teams to 10 teams, enabling the league to give another post-season game each to CBS and NBC. This was partially due to the league's 1976 expansion to 28 teams.

Meanwhile, the Super Bowl became a yearly ratings blockbuster, allowing the broadcasting network to generate millions of dollars in advertising revenue. Four of the ten highest rating television broadcasts of all-time (in the U.S.) are Super Bowls. When the league signed a new 5-year TV contract with the three networks in 1982, it allowed ABC to enter into the Super Bowl rotation; Super Bowl XIX was ABC's debut. Since then, the network that televises each Super Bowl is determined by the contracts that the league negotiates with all of its broadcasters. Each network broadcaster generally gets one Super Bowl before any received a second. This process repeats before any network airs a third event, although the TV contracts usually expire by that time.

== Expansion to cable and satellite TV ==
Cable TV became commonplace during the 1980s, and the NFL was eager to exploit that opportunity in 1987.

In 1986, the United States Football League, at the time pursuing an antitrust lawsuit against the NFL, signed an agreement with ESPN to carry games on Sunday nights. When the lawsuit failed and the 1986 season was canceled, the NFL swooped in and took the time slot, creating ESPN Sunday Night Football in 1987. ESPN thus became the first cable network to broadcast regular season NFL games. Chris Berman helped redefine the pre- and post-game shows when he launched NFL Countdown and NFL Prime Time, and they have since become the top-rated pre- and post-game shows on television. The cable network's contract to show ESPN Sunday Night Football was one of the turning points in their growth, transforming them from a small cable network to a marketing empire.

When ESPN first started televising NFL games in 1987, it only broadcast Sunday night games during the second half of the season. Meanwhile, ABC, CBS, and NBC maintained their rights to Monday Night Football, the NFC, and the AFC, respectively.

By 1990, Turner's TNT network started to broadcast Sunday night games for the first half of the season. The combined 1990 contracts with ABC, CBS, ESPN, NBC, and TNT totaled $3.6 billion ($900 million per year), the largest in TV history. One major factor in the increased rights fee was that the league changed the regular season so that all teams would play their 16-game schedule over a 17-week period. ABC was also given the rights to televise the two Saturday games on the opening weekend of the postseason. This was made possible after the league expanded its playoff format to include more teams.

TBS had also broadcast the infamous 1982 "strike" games. The NFLPA called for a players' strike three weeks into that season which reduced it to nine games. In October, two "all-star" exhibition games were held with generic NFC and AFC teams in Los Angeles and Washington, D.C., and aired on TBS. Ratings and attendance at both games was minimal.

In 1994, the league signed an exclusivity agreement with the direct broadcast satellite (DBS) service DirecTV to launch NFL Sunday Ticket, a satellite television subscription service that offers every regular season NFL game.

== Broadcast realignments ==
=== NFL leaves CBS after 38 years ===
When contracts were signed in December 1993, CBS (which had been home to NFC games for 38 years) lost their rights to the fledgling Fox Network, and it just so happened that CBS also lost its MLB coverage (which it never recovered) after that same year. Fox offered a then-record $1.58 billion to the NFL over four years, significantly more than the $290 million per year offered by CBS. Fox was only seven years old and had no sports division, but it began building its own coverage by hiring many former CBS personalities such as Summerall and Madden.

Fox's NFL rights ownership made the network a major player in American television by attracting many new viewers (and affiliates) and a platform to advertise its other shows. In the meantime, CBS lost several affiliates (mainly owned by New World Communications in NFC markets) to Fox, and ratings for its other offerings languished. CBS lost a number of affiliates, primarily in Atlanta, Detroit, and Milwaukee, where it was dropped to lower-powered UHF affiliates unable to be received in some areas.

Due to satellite television, the NFL Sunday Ticket in local markets, and rules of the time, satellite subscribers were required to use antennas to pick up local affiliates. CBS was devastated by the loss of over-the-air availability of these stations in the outer reaches of some markets. Since 1994, the situations in Milwaukee and Atlanta have improved due to committed station ownerships and acquisition of high-profile syndicated programming, along with the digital transition equalizing the field into being received via UHF-only, while CBS's Detroit station continues to struggle for relevancy and exists mainly as an automated pass-through for CBS programming, along with shows from the network's syndication arm, CBS Television Distribution.

ABC, NBC, TNT and ESPN renewed their contracts in the meanwhile. TNT was able to get a stipulation that the Atlanta Falcons, based in Turner's home of Atlanta, be featured on TNT once a year, regardless of the previous season's record.

=== NBC temporarily loses the NFL ===
Meanwhile, NBC's rebound in the overall ratings in both the 1980s and 1990s after years at the bottom of the ratings were partly attributed to its continuing coverage of the NFL. With television contract re-negotiations in early 1998 ushering in the era of multibillion-dollar broadcasting agreements, an era of pro football broadcasting was about to end. CBS, stung by Fox's surprise bid four years earlier, aggressively sought to reacquire some broadcasting rights. CBS agreed to pay $4 billion over eight years ($500 million per season) to air AFC games.

NBC, meanwhile, had indicated a desire to bid for Monday Night Football rights in 1998, but gave up when the financial stakes increased sharply. Thus, after six decades, NBC, the network that had shaped television broadcasts of football, lost its rights, thus marking the beginning of a slow decline for its sports division, culminating in the unproductive 2004–05 primetime season, when NBC carried no major sporting championships during prime time (NBC had already lost Major League Baseball broadcasting rights in 2000 and National Basketball Association rights in 2002; they had acquired National Hockey League rights in 2004, but that league's entire 2004–05 season was canceled due to a lockout, and furthermore, it was the least popular of the major leagues at the time).

NBC's attempts to replace the NFL with other professional football, including the XFL in 2001 and the Arena Football League coverage from 2003 to 2006, proved to be very unsuccessful. Like CBS before it, NBC would later decide that not having NFL rights did too much damage to its overall ratings to justify foregoing the high rights fees required.

The other networks also signed eight-year deals in 1998. Fox extended its NFC deal by agreeing to a $4.4 billion contract ($550 million per season). ABC retained its longtime rights to Monday Night Football by also paying $4.4 billion over eight years. ESPN agreed to a $4.8 billion ($600 million a season) deal to become the sole cable broadcaster of NFL games, marking an end to the league's association with TNT. As with previous television contracts, the coverage of the Super Bowl was divided between the broadcast networks.

== Kickoff Game ==
In 2002, the NFL began scheduling a Thursday night special opening "Kickoff" game, taking place on the Thursday after Labor Day leading into the opening Sunday slate of NFL games. The event includes a pre-game concert and other televised festivities. The first series of these events were held in New York and Washington, D.C., respectively, to celebrate both cities' resilience in the wake of the September 11, 2001 attacks. The 2002 San Francisco 49ers and the New York Giants game was held on September 5 and televised on ESPN. The 2003 edition featured the Washington Redskins hosting the New York Jets on September 4, 2003, and the game was televised by ABC. Since 2006, NBC has televised the Kickoff game (see below).

Starting in 2004, the NFL began awarding the opening game to the defending Super Bowl champions as the official start of their title defense. The unfurling of the team's Super Bowl championship banner in their stadium has become a centerpiece of the opening ceremonies.

In 2012, the kickoff game between the New York Giants and Dallas Cowboys aired on Wednesday, September 5, to avoid conflict with the final night of the Democratic National Convention in which incumbent president Barack Obama delivered his acceptance speech for the party nomination.

On two occasions since 2004, the defending Super Bowl champion has not hosted the Kickoff Game:

- In 2013, due to a scheduling and parking contract with baseball's Baltimore Orioles, the Baltimore Ravens played the Kickoff Game on the road against the Denver Broncos.
- In 2019, the New England Patriots hosted the Pittsburgh Steelers on Sunday Night Football, with the Kickoff Game instead seeing the Chicago Bears host the Green Bay Packers.

== Financial losses lead to another realignment ==
Recently, the NFL's television broadcasters have suffered annual financial losses because advertising revenue is unable to keep up with the rising costs of broadcast rights.

Nevertheless, the current broadcast contract, which began in 2006, resulted in a sizable increase in total rights fees. Both Fox and CBS renewed their Sunday afternoon broadcast packages through 2011, in both cases with modest increases. Furthermore, the league and DirecTV signed a five-year extension to their exclusivity deal on NFL Sunday Ticket.

Despite relatively high, if declining, television ratings, ABC decided to end its relationship with the NFL after losing significant money on Monday Night Football. In addition to the fees, part of this decision may have been the result of a resurgent ABC prime time entertainment schedule during the 2004–05 season, particularly on Sunday evening with Desperate Housewives; thus ABC would be unable to satisfy the league's reported preference for a Sunday night game on broadcast television as opposed to Monday.

Because of that, Monday Night Football moved from ABC to ESPN, which are both owned by The Walt Disney Company. The cable network paid $1.1 billion per year from 2006 to 2014 for the rights. Unlike the broadcast networks, however, ESPN can generate revenue from subscription sales, in addition to traditional commercial breaks (ESPN's subscriber fees are the highest of any American cable network, more than four times that of second-place TNT). The cable network's coverage begins at 1:00 p.m. ET with SportsCenter Special Edition: Monday Night Kickoff. The 2009 edition saw the game itself start at 8:30 p.m., with Mike Tirico, Ron Jaworski, and Jon Gruden in the broadcast booths.

Meanwhile, NBC, after losing the AFC package to CBS in 1997, was able to reclaim some broadcast rights with a deal worth an average of $650 million per year to air the Sunday night package from 2006 to 2014 (not much more than what ESPN used to pay for the same rights). This new deal included the Super Bowl in 2009 and 2012.

NBC's coverage also includes two preseason games (including the annual Hall of Fame Game), the first two Wild Card playoff games of each post-season, and the annual Thursday opening Kickoff Game, similar to ABC's broadcast rights package. The major difference was that the NFL allowed NBC flexibility in selecting games in the latter part of the season. ABC did not have the right to be flexible with their Monday Night Football schedule and picked matchups based on a team's record in the previous season (as NBC does), which often led to teams with losing records playing each other on Monday night later in the season.

The moves were intended to break NBC out of its ratings slump; however, at one point in the last decade, this did not happen, and although NBC Sunday Night Football had been (and continues to be) the network's top rated program and in the top 30 for viewing audience, it had not lifted the rest of the schedule. For a time, NBC had been firmly in fourth place and was losing large sums of money, so much so that the network had to cut an hour of prime time programming from its weeknight schedule in favor of The Jay Leno Show, a somewhat lower budget talk show which lasted five months. The network has since slowly come back to second place in the network ratings.

Coverage of NBC Sunday Night Football starts at 8:15 p.m. ET with Al Michaels serving as the play-by-play announcer, Cris Collinsworth as color commentator, and Michele Tafoya as the sole sideline reporter. Each telecast begins with a pre-game show airing at 7 p.m. ET entitled Football Night in America, hosted by Liam McHugh.

In addition, for the first three years of the contract, the network that carried the Super Bowl also broadcast the Pro Bowl on the Saturday night following the championship game. In 2007, CBS broadcast both games, followed by Fox in 2008, and NBC in 2009. In 2010, the Pro Bowl was played the weekend before the Super Bowl, broadcast by ESPN. The 2010 deal was meant as a one-time situation to protect the Winter Olympics in Vancouver that started the next week (as well as the NBA All-Star Game and the Daytona 500), however the NFL would have the Pro Bowl regularly be played one week before the Super Bowl there after.

The NFL Network was created by the league in 2003 and given a separate package of broadcast games. The eight-game package consisted of prime time games which in 2006 and 2007 began airing from Thanksgiving to the end of the regular season. Five games aired on Thursday nights and three on Saturday nights, the latter beginning Week 15 of the season. Starting in the 2008 season the ratio and dates of the games changed: now there are seven Thursday night games beginning in the first week of November and continuing to Week 16. There is only one Saturday night game, airing during Week 15 or 16 (usually 16, but when Saturday is Christmas Eve, it airs in week 15). The NFL could theoretically decide to sell this package to another network should NFL Network broadcasts not generate enough revenue. NFL Network will also carry several preseason games. The introduction of the NFL Network games also marked the end to late-season Saturday afternoon regular season games on the networks that aired Sunday afternoon games: CBS, Fox and NBC.

== 2011–2022 ==
ESPN renewed its contract with the NFL in 2011 which extends to ESPN the NFL broadcast rights through the 2021–22 season. ESPN increased the purchase price for the eighteen-game package, which included the Pro Bowl starting in 2015. Cable television operators condemned the contract, noting that ESPN had the highest retransmission consent fees of any national cable television channel, nearly five times higher than the nearest competitor (TNT), and raised fees on an annual basis. Nevertheless, the other networks had intended to follow suit by renewing their contracts through 2021–22, increasing their price to over $1 billion per year. The remaining networks announced they had indeed renewed with the NFL on December 14, 2011. Both the new ESPN and broadcast deals take effect in 2014 and continued through Super Bowl LVI in 2022.

As for the rest of the changes, they consisted of the following:

- NFL Network televised 13 (later increased to 16, then 18) Thursday Night Football games from Week 2 through Week 15 (later extended to Week 17) not including the Thanksgiving night game on NBC. All teams played one nationally televised Thursday game during the season and 26 teams (all except the Dallas Cowboys and the Detroit Lions who always play on Thanksgiving, whoever their opponents are in a given year, and the two teams that play in NBC's Thanksgiving game) appeared on the NFL Network's Thursday Night Football. (This stipulation was no longer strictly enforced; in 2017, two of the teams that played on Thanksgiving faced off in the next week's Thursday Night game.) The Kickoff Game does not count towards each team's allotment of one Thursday game per year (instead it counts towards the Sunday night football appearances due to it being in NBC's Sunday night football package).
- Saturday night was briefly returned to the other networks as a "flex night" to accommodate holidays and other scheduling conflicts; ESPN used a Saturday game (Falcons at Lions) on December 22, 2012, to avoid playing a game on Christmas Eve as it was forced to do in 2007. It was during that Falcons-Lions game that Detroit's Calvin Johnson set an NFL record for most receiving yards in a season (he finished the season with 1,964 receiving yards). NFL Network later reclaimed Saturday nights as their own in 2017; by 2018, the league was again forced to schedule a game on Christmas Eve night because of this.
- Flexible scheduling began earlier in the season and allowed games to be shifted between Fox and CBS as well as to NBC. This also helped the mandate all 32 teams appear on CBS and Fox at least once each year if possible.
- Beginning in 2014–15, NBC only televised one Wild Card Weekend game, choosing instead to add a divisional round game. The additional wild card game was picked up by ESPN, which, beginning in 2015–16, returned that game to ABC, returning that network to NFL coverage for the first time in a decade; ESPN still aired the game itself as well. This change also eliminated two issues with the Wild Card game directly relating to syndication of cable games.
  - A team that did not appear on Monday Night Football during the season could be playing in the Wild Card game. Since the NFL only sells syndicated packages to teams that play a Monday night game during the season, the logistics selling a sealed bid package of a single playoff game to local television stations on Monday morning for a Saturday game would be improbable. While in 2014, both Carolina and Arizona played on Monday during the season, the stations with the Monday night package were able to air the game in the local markets.
  - The logistics of the local rights holder having to clear up to four hours of air time (some of which may have already been sold for infomercials) for the game, and sell all of the local advertising breaks, within a five-day notice also played into the move to an ABC deal.
- NBC's Spanish-language channels (originally reported as being over-the-air network Telemundo, but later changed to cable-only mun2) began a Spanish language simulcast of Sunday Night Football. (Prior to this, Telemundo had aired Spanish commentary on the second audio program of the main NBC channel, but not on Telemundo itself.)
- NBC Sports Network was originally to begin airing a competing Sunday morning pregame show going against ESPN Sunday NFL Countdown in 2014–15. (This never materialized, due to the channel's rapid shift in direction toward English soccer by the time of the fall 2014 season and heavy competition from other unofficial NFL preview shows on ESPN, Fox Sports 1 and CBS Sports Network.)
- ESPN regained exclusive rights to the Pro Bowl, should the game be continued (the league has considered discontinuing the contest), beginning in 2014–15. Beginning in the 2017–18 season, this game was also simulcast on ABC.

In addition to that, all of the networks were afforded the rights to stream games on the Internet via the TV Everywhere initiative, but not to mobile devices (as Verizon Wireless, through its NFL Mobile app, maintained exclusive rights to all devices 7 inches (18 cm) or smaller through the 2017 season); the streaming rights are effective immediately, as NBC and Verizon both carried Super Bowl XLVI online for the first time. NBC is paying an average annual rights fee of $950 million for its broadcast rights; CBS $1 billion, and Fox $1.1 billion; the actual amount is slightly lower at the beginning of the contract and higher at the end to compensate for inflation.

On February 5, 2014, the league announced it had sold off eight weeks of the NFL Network's Thursday Night Football package to CBS, who outbid competitors ABC, Fox, NBC, and Turner Sports. NFL Network simulcast CBS' Thursday night games from weeks 2 through 8, continued to carry the Thursday night games from Week 9 onward, and also carried two Saturday night games (Week 16 doubleheader) for the first time since 2011, with one of those games being simulcast on CBS.

All of these games (except for the one NFL Network-only Saturday night game) were announced by CBS' lead commentating team of Jim Nantz (play-by-play) and Phil Simms (color analyst). The deal with CBS was initially only for the 2014 season, with the league having the option to extend it for an additional season. CBS is paying an additional $275 million for the package. Local CBS affiliates automatically get the local simulcast rights to any game carried only on NFL Network. The league exercised the option to extend its agreement with CBS through the 2015 season.

For 2016 and 2017, the league split a ten-game package of Thursday night games between NBC and CBS, with each paying an estimated $225 million per season for five games; CBS's games were in the early part of the season as before, while NBC's games were later in the season. Under the terms of NFL Network's retransmission agreements with cable providers, the NFL has included a stipulation requiring seven games in the Thursday Night Football package to be carried solely on NFL Network; for the 2018 season, potential bidders were free to place a bid on a package ranging from anywhere between four and eleven games. Fox, the winning bidder, bought all eleven games that were up for bids. As the eighteen total games involve more time slots than can be accommodated with the fourteen Thursday night time slots (excluding the kickoff, Thanksgiving, and the last week of the season when no Thursday game is played), four of the games are played on days other than Thursdays (usually this involves at least one game in London in a Sunday morning time slot and the remainder on Saturdays, all NFL Network exclusives), or if Christmas lands on a Monday, either a Christmas Eve or Christmas Day game.

Beginning in 2020, select Monday Night Football were simulcast on ABC under the branding ESPN Monday Night Football on ABC. In the 2020 season, three games were simulcast. In the 2021 season, three Monday Night Football games and the new Week 18 Saturday doubleheader were simulcast.

=== Digital rights ===
Verizon has held rights to carry video simulcasts of NFL games to devices 7 inches (18 cm) or less since such simulcasts have been viable. The company initially made these telecasts available only to its own wireless service subscribers, even going so far as to block the networks from providing their own feeds to those devices. Beginning in 2018, at the league's behest, it broadened the availability to all devices of that size and offered them through a newly acquired subsidiary, Yahoo! Sports. (Yahoo! has twice carried exclusive NFL games, both based in London, which were available to larger devices as well.) At the same time, Verizon dropped its prohibition on the networks offering the feeds to small devices. Verizon's NFL feeds are limited to Sunday and Monday nights, plus the locally telecast game in the phone's location (determined by the phone's GPS locator); Verizon offers Thursday night games but will only stream those games over a mobile data connection, whereas other games streamed through Verizon can use Wi-Fi.

The Thursday Night Football contract, uniquely among the league's television packages, has a separate digital contract allowing games to be carried freely to all Internet devices since 2016. Twitter carried the 2016 season before being outbid in 2017 by Amazon, who has held the rights since. For the 2017 season it required an Amazon Prime subscription to access the streams; it began offering the streams freely through its gaming-centric streaming service Twitch in 2018.

In March 2021, Amazon acquired exclusive rights to TNF as part of the next round of NFL broadcasting agreements starting in 2022. NFL Network, Fox, and Amazon subsequently opted out of the final year of its agreement, meaning that Amazon's rights began in the 2022 NFL season instead.

== 2023–2033 ==
On March 13, 2021, the league announced a new agreement with ESPN/ABC, CBS, Fox, and NBC that will run from 2023 to 2033, worth over $110 billion ($10 billion/year). Among the new changes:

- One game will exclusively be on Peacock for the first six seasons.
- Flexible scheduling will be expanded to include Monday Night Football.
- The amount of "cross-flexing" between CBS and Fox will increase. Under the new system, CBS and Fox will be able to protect a limited number of games involving a specific number of teams from their respective conference.
- ABC/ESPN will be added to the Super Bowl rotation.
- The four broadcasters will now each air one divisional playoff game per season, with ABC/ESPN taking over the slot that was previously rotated annually between CBS and Fox.

In a separate deal, YouTube TV takes over the rights for NFL Sunday Ticket from DirecTV for $2 billion a year.

These deals have an opt-out clause after the 2029 season, with the exception for ESPN/ABC, whose opt-out clause is after 2030.
