= Elmer Angsman =

American football player (1925–2002)

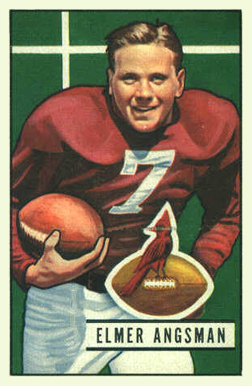

No. 7
- Position: Halfback

Personal information
- Born: December 11, 1925; Chicago, Illinois, U.S.
- Died: April 11, 2002 (aged 76); West Palm Beach, Florida, U.S.
- Listed height: 5 ft 11 in (1.80 m)
- Listed weight: 200 lb (91 kg)

Career information
- High school: Mt. Carmel (Chicago)
- College: Notre Dame (1943-1945)
- NFL draft: 1946: 3rd round, 16th overall pick

Career history
- Chicago Cardinals (1946–1952)

Awards and highlights
- NFL champion (1947); Second-team All-Pro (1949); Pro Bowl (1950); National champion (1943)

Career NFL statistics
- Rushing yards: 2,908
- Rushing average: 4.3
- Receptions: 41
- Receiving yards: 654
- Total touchdowns: 32
- Stats at Pro Football Reference

Elmer Joseph "Bud" Angsman Jr. (December 11, 1925 – April 11, 2002) was an American professional football player who was a halfback for the Chicago Cardinals of the National Football League (NFL) from 1946 to 1952. He was the leading rusher on the 1947 Cardinals team that won the NFL championship. In the 1947 NFL Championship Game, he set a championship game record with 159 rushing yards, including two runs of 70 yards each. In both 1948 and 1949, he ranked second in the NFL in rushing yards per carry and third in total rushing yards. After the 1950 season, he was selected to the inaugural Pro Bowl.

Angsman also played college football for the Notre Dame Fighting Irish from 1943 to 1945. As a 17-year-old freshman, he was a reserve player on their 1943 team that won a national championship. He was selected by the Cardinals with the 16th overall pick in the 1946 NFL draft.

== Early life and career ==
Angsman was born in Chicago in 1925. He grew up on Chicago's South Side and attended Mount Carmel High School.

Angsman played college football for Notre Dame from 1943 to 1945. He was a 17-year-old reserve player on the 1943 Notre Dame Fighting Irish football team that won a national championship. He played fullback and halfback on Notre Dame's 1944 and 1945 teams. He lost several teeth in a 6-6 tie with No. 3 Navy in November 1945. He was also a member of the college all-star team that defeated the NFL champion Cleveland Rams in August 1946.

== Chicago Cardinals ==
Angsman was selected by the Chicago Cardinals in the third round, 16th overall pick, of the 1946 NFL draft. As a rookie in 1946, he rushed for 328 yards on 48 carries for a career-high average of 6.8 yards per carry.

In 1947, he led the Cardinals with 412 rushing yards on 110 carries. In the 1947 NFL Championship Game against the Philadelphia Eagles, Angsman set a new record for an NFL championship game with 159 rushing yards on 10 carries, breaking the prior record of 109 yards set by Bill Osmanski in 1940. Angsman scored twice on runs of 70 yards each. At the time of his death in 2002, his 15.9 yard per carry average was still an NFL post-season record (10 carries or more).

Don Paul, a former defensive back for the Cardinals and later the Cleveland Browns, described Angsman as "a straight ahead north and south runner who would just as soon leave cleat marks on your balls as run around you."

In 1948, Angsman ranked third in the NFL with 638 rushing yards on 120 carries, trailing only Steve Van Buren (945 yards) and teammate Charley Trippi (690 yards). Angsman's eight rushing touchdowns and his average of 4.9 yards per carry both ranked second in the NFL. The Cards edged the Chicago Bears for the West Conference title. They met the Eagles once again in the 1948 NFL Championship Game now referred to as "The Blizzard Bowl". The field was covered by snow and the entire game was played in a storm. The Cardinals running attack was greatly hampered. Angsman gained only 33 yards on 10 carries. The Eagles won the game, 7–0.

Angsman had his best season in 1949 with 674 yards rushing, again ranking third best in the NFL. His 1949 average of 5.4 yards per carry ranked second in the NFL. Angsman's production fell off significantly in 1950 and 1951, with 363 and 380 yards, respectively, and an average under 3.5 yards per carry. Angsman was selected to the inaugural Pro Bowl after the 1950 season.

By 1952, with rookie halfback Ollie Matson joining the club, Angsman was relegated to a backup role. He retired after the 1952 season at age 27. He finished with career totals of 683 carries, 2,908 rushing yards (4.3 yards per carry), and 27 touchdowns. He caught 41 passes for 654 yards and five touchdowns.

== NFL career statistics ==
Legend
	Won the NFL championship
	Led the league
**Bold**	Career high

=== Regular season ===
Year	Team	Games		Rushing					Receiving				
Year	Team	GP	GS	Att	Yds	Avg	Lng	TD	Rec	Yds	Avg	Lng	TD
1946	CHI	11	5	48	328	**6.8**	61	2	2	44	22.0	38	0
1947	CHI	12	1	110	412	3.7	18	7	5	138	**27.6**	52	**1**
1948	CHI	12	8	**131**	638	4.9	72	**8**	**9**	142	15.8	38	**1**
1949	CHI	12	12	125	**674**	5.4	**82**	6	5	57	11.4	32	0
1950	CHI	12	12	102	362	3.5	21	1	7	56	8.0	20	**1**
1951	CHI	12	12	121	380	3.1	28	3	**9**	**195**	21.7	**80**	**1**
1952	CHI	12	2	46	114	2.5	9	0	4	22	5.5	9	**1**
		83	52	683	2,908	4.3	82	27	41	654	16.0	80	5

=== Playoffs ===
Year	Team	Games		Rushing					Receiving				
Year	Team	GP	GS	Att	Yds	Avg	Lng	TD	Rec	Yds	Avg	Lng	TD
1947	CHI	1	0	**10**	**159**	**15.9**	**70**	**2**	**1**	-4	-4.0	-4	0
1948	CHI	1	1	**10**	33	3.3	18	0	0	0	0.0	0	0
		2	1	20	192	9.6	70	2	1	-4	-4.0	-4	0

== Family and later years ==
Angsman was married in 1951 to Suzanne Skahen. He later remarried to his second wife, Diane

After his playing career ended, Angsman founded a food brokerate business. In the early 1980s, he and two partners founded a company in Indiana that manufactured paper plates. He continued working for the paper plate business until his retirement in 1998.

In 1958, Angsman began work for CBS Radio as a color commentator on football games. He later worked as a color commentator on college and professional football games for ABC and then NBC. He retired from broadcasting in 1972. Angsman called college and pro games, most notably the 1968 Sugar Bowl and several Orange Bowl games. He is a member of the Chicagoland Sports Hall of Fame.

In later years, Angsman had homes in both Chicago and Juno Beach, Florida. He died in April 2002, suffering a heart attack on the golf course at Ironhorse Country Club in West Palm Beach, Florida.
