= Sports Broadcasting Act of 1961 =

United States federal antitrust broadcasting law

- Long title: An Act to amend the antitrust laws to authorize leagues of professional football, baseball, basketball, and hockey teams to enter into certain television contracts, and for other purposes.
- Acronyms (colloquial): SBA
- Enacted by: the 87th United States Congress

Citations
- Public law: Pub. L. 87–331
- Statutes at Large: 75 Stat. 732

Codification
- Acts amended: Sherman Antitrust Act
- Titles amended: Title 15—Commerce and Trade
- U.S.C. sections created: 15 U.S.C. §§ 1291–1295

Legislative history
- Introduced in the House as H.R. 9096 by Emanuel Celler (D–NY) on September 7, 1961; Committee consideration by House Judiciary; Passed the House on September 18, 1961; Passed the Senate on September 21, 1961; Signed into law by President John F. Kennedy on September 30, 1961

The Sports Broadcasting Act of 1961 (SBA); (codified 15 U.S.C. §§ 1291–1295) is a U.S. federal statute that amended antitrust laws to allow professional sports leagues to pool the broadcasting rights held by all their teams and sign league-wide exclusive contracts with national television networks. It also added provisions limiting the days, times, and locations of when and where professional football games could be telecast under this antitrust exemption so they avoid competing with most high school football and college football games.

== Background ==
The Sports Broadcasting Act was passed in response to the cumulative effect of various antitrust court cases against the National Football League (NFL) dating back to the 1950s.

With the advent of television, the NFL gave its teams permission to sell the broadcast rights of games to local stations in 1947. However, this caused stadium attendance to significantly drop as fans could watch the games on TV for free instead of buying tickets to see them in person. By 1949, only the Los Angeles Rams were broadcasting their home games. To address the attendance issue, the league implemented its first broadcasting blackout policy in 1951: all broadcasts on radio and television of any games in the home city of origin and on any television stations located within 75 miles (121 km) of the team's home city were blacked out (not aired), regardless of whether they were sold out, during those time periods when the teams were playing at home. Teams were also allowed to restrict home-market stations from broadcasting games in other markets during the times they were playing away games broadcast live in their home market. Even if they gave their approval for a telecast or broadcast they might otherwise have been able to permit, the NFL commissioner was still required to approve it, and did not need to give an explanation.

The U.S. Department of Justice brought an antitrust lawsuit against the league over this blackout policy on grounds that it violated the Sherman Antitrust Act since the policy essentially gave the NFL unilateral power to decide where games would be broadcast instead of the individual teams. The NFL argued that the antitrust exemption for professional baseball and recently reaffirmed by the U.S. Supreme Court applied to it. In his 1953 ruling, Judge Allan Kuhn Grim of the Eastern District of Pennsylvania declined to reach that question, holding that since antitrust law clearly applied to radio and television, it applied in the instant case as well, and granted an injunction barring all those practices save the restriction on outside-market game broadcasts during home games. The Supreme Court later ruled in Radovich v. National Football League in 1957, rejecting the NFL's claim to the same antitrust exemption as baseball.

In 1960, the rival American Football League (AFL) began its first season, bolstered with the help of a major network contract with ABC. The AFL's contract with ABC was the first-ever cooperative TV plan in professional football, in which the league pools the broadcasting rights by all their teams, signs a league-wide exclusive contract with a national network, and the proceeds are then divided equally among the member clubs. Attempted to duplicate the AFL's success with ABC, the NFL signed a similar contract with CBS in April 1961. The league then filed a petition with the District Court, stating that the CBS contract did not violate Judge Grim's previous 1953 ruling. Grim however disagreed, ruling that the new agreement would instead give CBS the unilateral power to decide where games would be broadcast instead of the individual teams. The NFL then lobbied Congress to override the ruling, and the Sports Broadcasting Act was signed into law by President John F. Kennedy on September 30.

== Provisions ==
The Sports Broadcasting Act permits certain joint broadcasting agreements among the major professional sports. It recognizes the fact that the various franchises in a sports league, while competitors in the sporting sense, are not as much business competitors as they are interdependent partners, whose success as enterprises is intertwined, as a certain level of competitive balance between them must exist for any of them to remain viable enterprises. Therefore, it permits the sale of a television "package" to a network or networks in which the league members share equally, a procedure which is common today. Of the four major North American professional team sports, the Act is most pertinent to the NFL, as all of its regular-season and playoff games are broadcast via the rights assigned to the networks via national broadcast rights packages, as opposed to local team broadcast rights as found in the other leagues.

The law has been interpreted to include the aforementioned blackout rules which protect a home team from competing games broadcast into its home territory on a day when it is playing at home, and from being required to broadcast games within its home market area that have not sold out, though none of the leagues implement such rules any longer.

The act withdrew antitrust immunity for any professional football telecast held on the same day that a high school or college football game is played within 75 miles (121 km) of the broadcasting station on Friday nights (after 6:00 p.m.) and Saturdays from the second Friday in September until the second Saturday in December. Because many college and high school games across the country are played within that proximity of a broadcasting station during those days and times, the NFL avoids scheduling any games during those days and times altogether.

== Exceptions ==
The NFL extended its season in 1978 to allow a few weeks of Friday night or Saturday games after the second Saturday in December, if the league so wished. Late-season Saturday games have been common since then, but Friday night games are still extremely rare; the league has played only nine Friday games since 1978, mostly because of the NFL's restrictions during Christmas. In 2005, a Miami Dolphins-Kansas City Chiefs game, scheduled for Sunday, October 23 in Miami, was moved up to 7:00 p.m. Friday night due to Hurricane Wilma. The game was televised only within 75 miles of Miami and Kansas City (outside of the home teams' markets, only affiliates in West Palm Beach, St. Joseph, and Topeka were allowed to televise it).

The NFL's introduction of a "Black Friday" game in 2023 circumvents the act by being scheduled as an afternoon game with a 3:00 p.m. kickoff, with the game usually reaching its conclusion shortly after the 6:00 p.m. curfew specified by the act. The games were broadcast exclusive to the primary markets of both teams, and available out-of-market via streaming services. The NFL requires all games to be broadcast over-the-air on broadcast stations to the two teams' primary markets (which includes Milwaukee for the Green Bay Packers).

In 2024 and 2025, an NFL International Series game was scheduled at Arena Corinthians in São Paulo, Brazil on the first Friday of September, both televised locally to the primary markets of both teams and available out-of-market via streaming services. The NFL could legally play those games on Friday because the scheduling restrictions do not take effect until the second Friday of the month. The 2026 NFL international game in Brazil, in Rio de Janeiro, was held on a Sunday evening at 5:25 p.m. Brasilia Standard Time (UTC-3), which corresponded to the NFL's standard Sunday game time of 4:25 p.m. Eastern Daylight Time (UTC-4) as a CBS-nationally televised game.
