= Paul Christman =

American football player (1918–1970)

- Christman, circa 1946

No. 15, 44, 28
- Position: Quarterback

Personal information
- Born: March 5, 1918; St. Louis, Missouri, U.S.
- Died: March 2, 1970 (aged 51); Lake Forest, Illinois, U.S.
- Listed height: 6 ft 0 in (1.83 m)
- Listed weight: 210 lb (95 kg)

Career information
- High school: Maplewood-Richmond Heights (Maplewood, Missouri)
- College: Missouri (1938–1940)
- NFL draft: 1941: 2nd round, 13th overall pick

Career history

Playing
- Chicago Cardinals (1945–1949); Green Bay Packers (1950)

Coaching
- Detroit Lions (1954–1955) Quarterbacks / offensive backs coach

Awards and highlights
- NFL champion (1947); Consensus All-American (1939); Second-team All-American (1940); Third-team All-American (1938); 3× First-team All-Big Six (1938, 1939, 1940); Missouri Tigers No. 44 retired

Career NFL statistics
- Passing attempts: 1,140
- Passing completions: 504
- Completion percentage: 44.2%
- TD–INT: 58–76
- Passing yards: 7,294
- Passer rating: 54.8
- Stats at Pro Football Reference
- College Football Hall of Fame

Paul Joseph Christman (March 5, 1918 – March 2, 1970) was an American professional football player who was a quarterback in the National Football League (NFL). He played college football for the Missouri Tigers before playing in the NFL for the Chicago Cardinals and Green Bay Packers. He was selected by the Cardinals in the second round of the 1941 NFL draft. He was inducted into the College Football Hall of Fame in 1956.

== Collegiate career ==
A St. Louis native, Christman led the Missouri Tigers to a 20–8 record during his three seasons (1938–40) as their starting quarterback. He was a two-time All-American, and led the nation in touchdown passes in 1940. Christman was Missouri's all-time leading passer until 1976, when he was surpassed by Steve Pisarkiewicz. While at Mizzou, he was a member of Kappa Sigma fraternity. His jersey number, 44, is one of seven retired by the school. In 1956, he was inducted into the College Football Hall of Fame.

== NFL career ==
Christman made his debut in the third week of the 1945 season. Facing the Philadelphia Eagles, he went 10-of-36 for 170 yards while also being trounced for -14 yards on three rushes. He threw his first touchdown pass on October 28. He led the league in passing attempts with 219 while completing 89 for 1,147 yards with five touchdowns to fourteen interceptions. He was less fortunate on the rushing attack, running for -34 yards on 30 carries with a touchdown, with all of this being done in eight games (with Chicago winning once) that resulted in 12 fumbles (four of which he lost), which was a league high. Christman was more fortunate in his second season, which saw him throw for 1,656 yards on 100-of-229 passing with 13 touchdowns to 18 interceptions as the Cardinals went 6-5 when he played. He had his finest game as a quarterback on October 13, throwing for four touchdowns on a 20-for-34 day of 263 yards (with two interceptions) and adding a rushing touchdown to beat the Detroit Lions 36–14. He fumbled the ball 15 times and lost it 12 times. Oddly enough, he would fumble the ball eight total times in his next four seasons combined (the 35 for a career was second alltime in history when he retired).

In 1947, the arrival of halfback Charley Trippi to accompany Christman, halfback Elmer Angsman and fullback Pat Harder, completed a desire for owner Charles Bidwill to have a "Dream Backfield", which was also referred to as a "Million Dollar Backfield. That year, Christman threw for 2,191 yards with 17 touchdowns to 22 interceptions as the Cardinals managed to go 9–3. This was good enough to qualify for the 1947 NFL Championship Game, where Christman went 3-of-14 for 54 yards with two interceptions. However, the Cardinals managed to hold on anyway for a 28–21 victory, which was their first championship in two decades. During the 1948 season, Christman made a cameo appearance in the film Triple Threat alongside teammate Charley Trippi. Christman missed four games the following year, which saw him throw just 114 passes for 740 yards with five touchdowns to four interceptions that saw Chicago make it all the way back to the NFL title game. He did not play in the NFL Championship Game that year when he fractured his left wrist in the season finale against the Bears; Ray Mallouf took snaps as quarterback versus the Eagles in the title game, which they lost 7–0. He played in twelve games in his final season for Chicago in 1949, which saw him throw for 1,015 yards for 11 touchdowns to 13 interceptions while having his most rushing yards as a player with 34 on four carries. He had his worst game of interceptions on October 23 against Detroit, oddly enough, where he threw for five interceptions on 6-of-17 passing. He was traded to the Green Bay Packers prior to the 1950 season. He threw for 545 times on 126 passes with seven touchdowns and interceptions each.

== NFL career statistics ==
Legend
	Won the NFL championship
	Led the league
**Bold**	Career high

=== Regular season ===
Year	Team	Games		Passing									Rushing				
Year	Team	GP	GS	Cmp	Att	Pct	Yds	Y/A	Lng	TD	Int	Rtg	Att	Yds	Avg	Lng	TD
1945	CRD	8	3	89	219	40.6	1,147	5.2	70	5	12	42.6	**30**	-34	-1.1	9	1
1946	CRD	11	3	100	229	43.7	1,656	7.2	**82**	13	18	54.8	28	-61	-2.2	6	**3**
1947	CRD	12	8	**138**	**301**	45.8	**2,191**	**7.3**	80	**17**	**22**	59.0	8	11	1.4	3	2
1948	CRD	7	2	51	114	44.7	740	6.5	71	5	4	**66.4**	8	6	0.8	5	1
1949	CRD	12	7	75	151	**49.7**	1,015	6.7	50	11	13	59.9	4	**34**	**8.5**	**22**	0
1950	CRD	11	1	51	126	40.5	545	4.3	44	7	7	49.2	7	18	2.6	4	1
Career		61	24	504	1,140	44.2	7,294	6.4	82	58	76	54.8	85	-26	-0.3	22	8

=== Playoffs ===
Year	Team	Games		Passing									Rushing				
Year	Team	GP	GS	Cmp	Att	Pct	Yds	Y/A	Lng	TD	Int	Rtg	Att	Yds	Avg	Lng	TD
1947	CRD	1	0	3	14	21.4	54	3.9	38	0	2	3.6	8	2	0.3	-	0
Career		1	0	3	14	21.4	54	3.9	38	0	2	3.6	8	2	0.3	-	0

== Broadcasting career ==
After retiring as a player, Christman worked as a television color commentator, first-teaming with play-by-play announcer Joe Boland to call Cardinals games for CBS in 1958 and 1959. In 1960 and 1961, he called college football games for ABC Sports alongside Curt Gowdy. In 1962, he began calling American Football League games on ABC with Gowdy, a pairing that continued after AFL rights shifted to NBC in 1965. Christman called Super Bowl I with Gowdy for NBC in January 1967. In 1968–69, he returned to CBS, teaming with Ray Scott on NFL broadcasts.

Christman also called the collegiate Orange Bowl game for several years, teaming with Boland (1960), Scott (1961), and Gowdy (1962–67). He and Gowdy then called the Rose Bowl game in 1968.

He called PGA Tour golf for several years with ABC & NBC.

== Personal ==
Christman's daughter is noted Scientology critic Tory Christman. His older brother was Major League Baseball infielder Mark Christman (1913–1976).

== Death ==
Christman died three days shy of his 52nd birthday in 1970 in Lake Forest, Illinois, from a heart attack. He had a history of heart trouble and was admitted to the hospital, where he died less than two days later. Christman was buried at All Saints Cemetery in Des Plaines, and was survived by his wife Inez and three adult children.

Preceded by Frankie Albert	NFL on NBC lead analyst 1965–1967	Succeeded by Kyle Rote
Preceded by First	Super Bowl television color commentator (AFC package carrier); 1966	Succeeded by Kyle Rote and Al DeRogatis
