= Charlie Jones (sportscaster) =

American sportscaster (1930–2008)

- Born: November 9, 1930; Fort Smith, Arkansas, US
- Died: June 12, 2008 (aged 77); La Jolla, California, US
- Education: University of Southern California undergraduate University of Arkansas Law
- Occupation: Sportscaster
- Spouse: Ann Jones (m. 1954)
- Children: 2

Charlie Jones (November 9, 1930 – June 12, 2008) was an American sportscaster for NBC and ABC.

== Early life ==
Charlie Jones was born in Fort Smith, Arkansas. He earned a bachelor's degree at the University of Southern California, where he was a tennis player, and a law degree at the University of Arkansas. He also served two years in the U.S. Air Force.

== Broadcasting career ==
=== American Football League/National Football League ===
Jones began his sportscasting career at local television and radio stations in Fort Smith, before signing on as a broadcaster for the fledgling Dallas Texans of the American Football League in 1960. Jones also began calling AFL games for ABC that year.

In 1965, he moved to NBC, continuing to broadcast the AFL and later the National Football League. He would work NFL games until 1997, when NBC lost their NFL (AFC) broadcasting rights to CBS. Among Jones' notable broadcasts was in January 1993, when he covered the Buffalo Bills vs. Houston Oilers Wild Card game, in which the Bills rallied from a 35–3 second half deficit to defeat the Oilers in overtime 41–38.

Jones was the sideline reporter for NBC for the first Super Bowl (named the World Championship Game until Super Bowl III), where he interviewed Bob Hope at halftime and Super Bowl IX. He was the radio play-by-play announcer for Super Bowl III.

In 1997, Jones was awarded the Pro Football Hall of Fame's Pete Rozelle Radio-Television Award. He also received an Emmy Award in 1973 for his part as writer, producer and host of the documentary Is Winning the Name of the Game?

=== Other TV work ===
During his time at NBC, Jones also broadcast the 1988 Summer Olympics calling the infamous Ben Johnson-Carl Lewis 100 meter dash, 1986 FIFA World Cup, 1991 Ryder Cup, 1992 Summer Olympics and 1996 Summer Olympics, as well as Major League Baseball, PGA Tour golf, and Wimbledon tennis.

He was the announcer for auto races including the 1988 Meadowlands Grand Prix and throughout the 1998 Formula One World Championship.

He was the play-by-play announcer for the 1986 college football national championship, where Penn State defeated Miami 14–10 in the 1987 Fiesta Bowl, and for the 1993 'Game of the Century', where #2 Notre Dame upset #1 Florida State, 31-24.

In 1999, he returned to ABC Sports to call college football through the 2001 season.

He was also a play-by-play announcer for the Cincinnati Reds in 1973 and 1974 (when Hank Aaron hit home run #714 to tie Babe Ruth on opening day), California Angels in 1990, and Colorado Rockies from 1993 to 1995.

In the mid-1970s, he hosted Almost Anything Goes with Regis Philbin, The American Frontier with Merlin Olsen, and Pro-Fan.

Jones, along with Frank Shorter, provided the voices of the TV announcers for a fictionalized staging of the U.S. Olympic Track and Field trials in the 1982 film Personal Best.

== Personal life ==
In 2008, Jones died at the age of 77 at his home in La Jolla, California of a heart attack.

He and his wife, Ann, had two children, Chuck and Julie. He is a member of the Arkansas Sports Hall of Fame (2000), the Texas Radio Hall of Fame (2007) and the Arkansas Sportscasters and Sportswriters Hall of Fame (2024).
