= Al DeRogatis =

American football player and sportscaster (1927–1995)

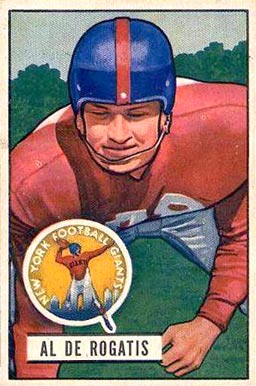
- DeRogatis on a 1951 Bowman football card

No. 78
- Positions: Defensive tackle, tackle

Personal information
- Born: May 5, 1927; Newark, New Jersey, U.S.
- Died: December 26, 1995 (aged 68); Neptune, New Jersey, U.S.
- Listed height: 6 ft 4 in (1.93 m)
- Listed weight: 238 lb (108 kg)

Career information
- High school: Central (Newark)
- College: Duke
- NFL draft: 1949: 2nd round, 14th overall pick

Career history
- New York Giants (1949–1952)

Awards and highlights
- First-team All-Pro (1951); 2× Pro Bowl (1950, 1951); Second-team All-American (1948); First-team All-SoCon (1946); Second-team All-SoCon (1948)

Career NFL statistics
- Games played: 46
- Games started: 36
- Fumble recoveries: 4
- Stats at Pro Football Reference
- College Football Hall of Fame

Albert John DeRogatis (May 5, 1927 – December 26, 1995) was an American professional football player and television and radio sportscaster.

== Life and career ==
DeRogatis was born in Newark, New Jersey, and attended the city's Central High School, earning All-State honors at center. At Duke University, after a knee injury shortened his junior season, he made the 1948 All-America team as a tackle.

He was drafted in the second round the following year by the New York Giants of the National Football League (NFL) and played defensive tackle. He was an NFL All-Pro in both 1950 and 1951. A recurrence of the knee injury he suffered at Duke ended his playing career after four seasons of professional football. For thirty-three years beginning in 1953, he served as a vice president with Prudential Insurance.

From 1966 through 1975, the bespectacled DeRogatis served as a color commentator for professional and college football telecasts on NBC, primarily with Curt Gowdy on the network's top broadcast team for American Football League (later, American Football Conference) regular-season and playoff matches, Super Bowls III, VII and IX and several Rose Bowls. He also was paired with Jim Simpson to call a few Orange Bowls. Prior to joining NBC, DeRogatis had begun his broadcasting career working with Marty Glickman on New York football Giants radio broadcasts on WNEW-AM from 1960 through 1965. DeRogatis was among several veteran announcers who returned to call some NFL telecasts for NBC in September 1988, while many of the network's regular broadcasters were busy calling that year's Summer Olympics in Seoul.

DeRogatis relinquished his NBC duties prior to the 1976 NFL season despite one more year remaining on his contract with the network. He was also Vice President for Community Affairs with the Prudential Insurance Company, president of the National Sight Foundation and afflicted with glaucoma at the time.

DeRogatis can be heard with Gowdy calling a football game in the 1978 film Heaven Can Wait.

DeRogatis was inducted into the College Football Hall of Fame in 1986. A resident of Spring Lake, New Jersey, he died of cancer at Jersey Shore Medical Center on December 26, 1995.

== Legacy ==
Sports Illustrated magazine's "Dr. Z" (aka Paul Zimmerman) has rated DeRogatis as his #1 football analyst of all time.

Upon his death in 1995, DeRogatis was eulogized in the Boston Globe as a prototype for what it means to be a gentleman, in the sense of displaying a gracious, polite, kind and generous nature. The Globe also published a picture of DeRogatis in the NBC booth together with Curt Gowdy and Don Meredith in the 2006: The year in photos series, after Curt Gowdy's death in 2006.

Preceded by Kyle Rote	NFL on NBC lead analyst 1971–1974	Succeeded by Don Meredith
Preceded by Kyle Rote	Super Bowl television color commentator (AFC package carrier); 1968-1974	Succeeded by Don Meredith
