= Jim Simpson (sportscaster) =

American sportscaster (1927–2016)

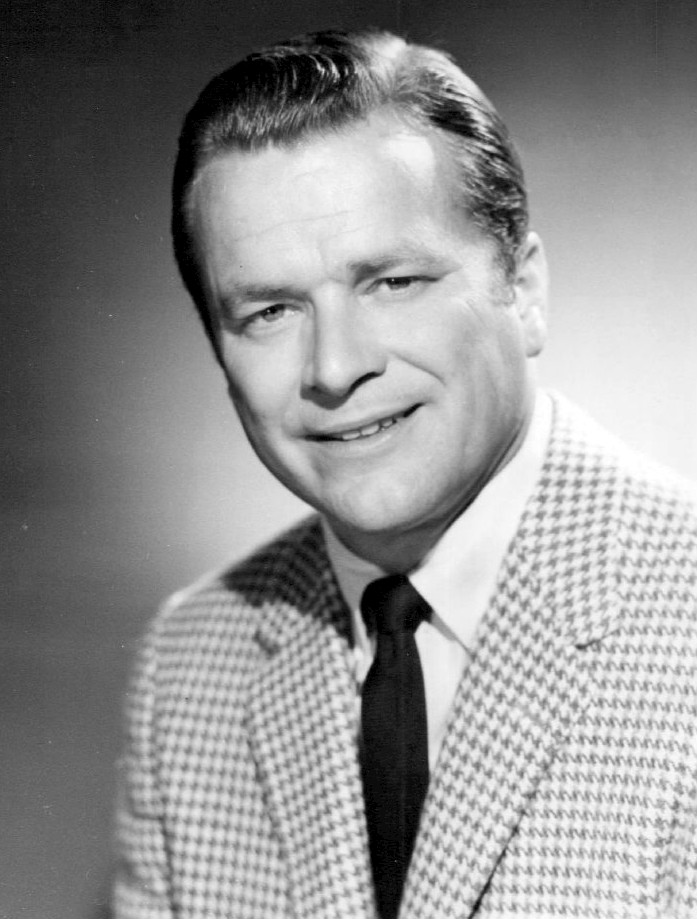
- Simpson in 1969
- Born: James Shores Simpson; December 20, 1927; Washington, D.C., U.S.
- Died: January 13, 2016 (aged 88); Scottsdale, Arizona, U.S.
- Occupation: sportscaster
- Years active: 1949–1994
- Awards: Sports Lifetime Achievement Award (1997); NSSA Hall of Fame (2000)

James Shores Simpson (December 20, 1927 – January 13, 2016) was an American sportscaster, known for his smooth delivery as a play-by-play man and his versatility in covering many different sports. In 1997, he won the Sports Lifetime Achievement Award, and in 2000 he was inducted into the National Sportscasters and Sportswriters Association Hall of Fame.

== Career ==
Jim Simpson was born in Washington, D.C., and grew up in nearby Chevy Chase, Maryland. He began his broadcasting career with a short-lived radio show, Hunting and Fishing with Jimmy Simpson, when he was 15. He attended George Washington University and served in the Coast Guard and Navy Reserve. After several jobs in radio, he began working in television in Washington in 1949.

In the early 1950s, he shared a half-hour news program at Washington's WTOP-TV with another TV newcomer, Walter Cronkite, the future anchor of the CBS Evening News. He joined NBC's owned-and-operated Washington station, WRC-TV, in 1955. Simpson broadcast Atlantic Coast Conference basketball games in the early 1960s and worked as a sports reporter at WRC-TV.

=== NBC Sports ===
Eventually Simpson would broadcast many sports at NBC, including football, basketball, baseball, tennis, and golf. For much of the 1960s and 1970s he was generally considered the network's number two play-by-play announcer, behind only Curt Gowdy. He was in New Haven, Connecticut on November 22, 1963, preparing to call the annual Harvard-Yale football game with Lindsey Nelson and Terry Brennan, when word came of the assassination of John F. Kennedy. Simpson was quoted as saying to Nelson as they walked through the tunnel of the Yale Bowl, "We will remember this walk and this moment for a long, long, time." His work on American Football League (and later American Football Conference) telecasts for NBC is perhaps what he is best remembered for.

In 1966, Simpson and Bill Cullen (who at the time, along with Simpson hosted a sports anthology series called NBC Sports in Action), were the between-periods co-hosts for NBC's Stanley Cup Finals broadcasts. It marked the first time that the Stanley Cup Finals were broadcast on American network television. It was also the first time that hockey games were broadcast on network television in color. The CBC would follow suit the following year.

On January 15, 1967, Simpson (along with former quarterback George Ratterman) called Super Bowl I for NBC radio. He also called three other Super Bowls and several World Series for NBC radio, as well as numerous Orange Bowl games, the 1966 FIFA World Cup Final (via tape delay), and several Olympic Games for NBC television.

=== ESPN ===
In 1979, after Week 2 of the NFL season, the fledgling ESPN cable sports network brought Simpson on board to provide some needed credibility with sports fans. Simpson broadcast the first NCAA basketball game the network televised, with flamboyant Dick Vitale as the color man. Vitale credits Simpson with helping him develop as a sportscaster. Simpson also called USFL, NBA, college football, and College World Series games for ESPN, in 1988 called the Baltimore Orioles' local telecasts on WMAR-TV (the NBC affiliate at the time), and called figure skating at the 1992 and 1994 Winter Olympics for TNT.

After his sportscasting days Simpson retired to St. Croix, Virgin Islands. Among other firsts he was the initial U.S. sportscaster to appear live via satellite from Asia, and he was involved in the first American sportscast using instant replay technology. In 2005, ESPN brought Simpson back from retirement to do play-by-play for a series of college basketball games in a "turn back the clock" format on the ESPN Classic network. He died on January 13, 2016, in Scottsdale, Arizona at the age of 88.
