= Kyle Rote =

American football player (1928–2002)

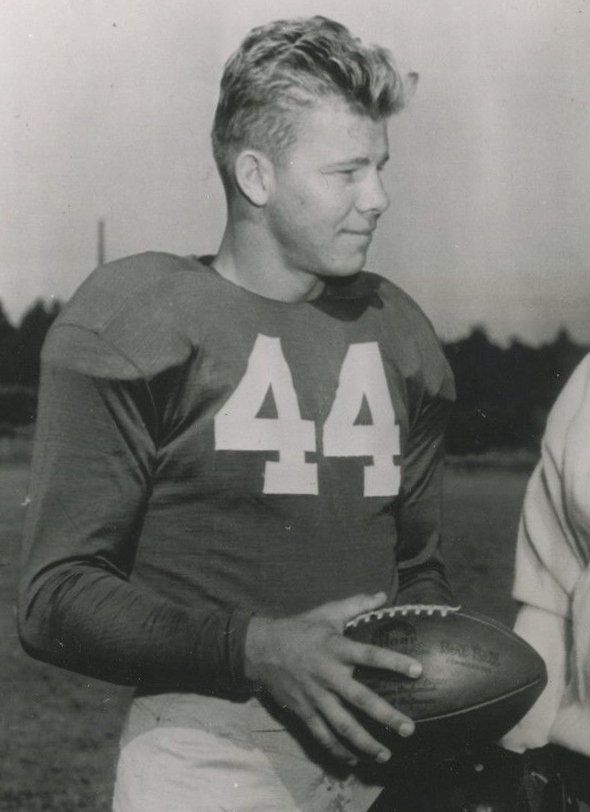
- Rote in 1951

No. 44
- Positions: Halfback, wide receiver

Personal information
- Born: October 27, 1928; San Antonio, Texas, U.S.
- Died: August 15, 2002 (aged 73); Baltimore, Maryland, U.S.
- Listed height: 6 ft 0 in (1.83 m)
- Listed weight: 199 lb (90 kg)

Career information
- High school: Thomas Jefferson (San Antonio)
- College: SMU (1947–1950)
- NFL draft: 1951: 1st round, 1st overall pick

Career history

Playing
- New York Giants (1951–1961)

Coaching
- New York Giants (1962–1963) Offensive coordinator

Awards and highlights
- NFL champion (1956); 2× Second-team All-Pro (1956, 1960); 4× Pro Bowl (1953–1956); New York Giants Ring of Honor; 24th greatest New York Giant of all-time; Consensus All-American (1950); 2× First-team All-SWC (1949, 1950)

Career NFL statistics
- Receptions: 300
- Receiving yards: 4,797
- Rushing yards: 871
- Rushing average: 3.8
- Total touchdowns: 52
- Stats at Pro Football Reference
- Coaching profile at Pro Football Reference
- College Football Hall of Fame

William Kyle Rote Sr. (October 27, 1928 – August 15, 2002) was an American professional football player who was a running back and wide receiver for eleven years in the National Football League (NFL) for the New York Giants. He was an All-American running back for the SMU Mustangs and was the first overall selection of the 1951 NFL draft. Following his playing career, Rote was the Giants backfield coach and later a sports broadcaster for WNEW and WNBC radio in New York and for NBC television.

== Early life ==
Born and raised in San Antonio, Texas, Rote was the son of Jack Tobin and Emma Belle (Owens) Rote. He was a first cousin of Tobin Rote. His family suffered tragedies during World War II; when he was 16, his mother was killed in a car accident and his older brother Jack was killed on Iwo Jima.

Rote attended Thomas Jefferson High School in San Antonio, where he earned All-State honors in both football and basketball, while also being considered one of the region's brightest pro-baseball prospects. He was a running back in football, a guard in basketball, an outfielder in baseball, and a member of the track team.

=== Collegiate career ===
After graduating from high school in 1947, Rote accepted an athletic scholarship to Southern Methodist University in Dallas, where he became one of the most celebrated collegiate football players in the country. In December 1949, in a near upset over eventual national champion Notre Dame, Rote ran for 115 yards, threw for 146 yards, and scored all three SMU touchdowns in a 27–20 loss. His performance was voted by the Texas Sportswriters Association as "The Outstanding Individual Performance by a Texas Athlete in the First Half of the 20th Century." Twenty-five years later, Notre Dame made Rote an "Honorary Member" of their Championship Team.

In the Cotton Bowl against Oregon in January 1949, SMU was on their own four-yard-line after a Norm Van Brocklin punt. Nearing halftime, Rote quick-kicked on first down from his own end zone, and the ball ended up 84 yards from the line of scrimmage, on the Oregon twelve.

In his senior year at SMU in 1950, Rote was runner-up for the Heisman Trophy, won by Vic Janowicz of Ohio State. While in college, Rote also played baseball and ran track for the Mustangs; he was inducted into the College Football Hall of Fame in 1964.

Immediately after graduation at SMU, Rote signed a contract with the Corpus Christi Aces of the Class B Gulf Coast Baseball League. In 23 games his batting average was .348.

== National Football League career ==
The New York Giants selected Rote with the first overall pick in the 1951 NFL draft. He started out as a running back, but after the first two years switched to wide receiver due to a knee injury. When Rote retired after the 1961 season, he had become the Giants' career leader in pass receptions (300), receiving yardage (4,805), and touchdown receptions (48). He was second highest in total touchdowns (52) and fifth-leading scorer (312 points). His average gain per catch was 15.9 yards. In all, Rote played in four world championship games, including the 1956 NFL Championship Game against the Chicago Bears, and the 1958 game won by the Baltimore Colts in sudden-death overtime 23–17, known as The Greatest Game, the first ever nationally televised NFL championship game. Rote was the captain of the New York Giants for eight years.

During his career, Rote made a guest appearance as an imposter for an undercover police officer on the May 13, 1958 episode of the CBS game show To Tell the Truth. He fooled the panel into thinking he was the officer, garnering three of the four possible votes from Polly Bergen, Jim Backus, and Joan Fontaine. Only Hy Gardner voted for the actual undercover police officer.

Rote spearheaded the movement that became the NFL Players Association, fighting for equal opportunities for all players, so that all players of all races would receive equal treatment when the teams played on the road. Rote became the NFLPA's first elected president serving for several years, and also acted as the Giants team representative.

Rote was inducted into the Cotton Bowl Hall of Fame, Texas Sports Hall of Fame, College Football Hall of Fame, Texas Pro Football Hall of Fame, San Antonio Hall of Fame, Texas High School Football Hall of Fame, Texas High School Basketball Hall of Fame, Southwest Conference All-Time Team, and received the SMU Distinguished Alumni Award. In 1995, Rote was named as wide receiver on the All-Time Giants Team in conjunction with the 75th celebration of the founding of the NFL. The Professional Football Researchers Association named Rote to the PRFA Hall of Very Good Class of 2006.

Rote retired in April 1962, then was the Giants' backfield coach for two seasons; in both those years, New York captured the NFL's Eastern Division championship, a third consecutive in 1963, but fell in each of the title games.

Out of the record 14 Touchdown Passes former teammate/halfback Frank Gifford threw in the NFL, Rote caught 4 of them.

== Sportscasting career ==
While in the NFL, Rote spent the offseasons as the sports director for radio station WNEW. In the 1960s and early 1970s, like his former Giant teammates Frank Gifford, Pat Summerall, and Dick Lynch, he enjoyed a second career as a sportscaster, working at NBC and WNBC New York on radio and television. Rote is generally believed to be the first athlete to use the popular slogan, "You cannot stop a great player like (ex. Jim Brown), you can only hope to contain him." The phrase is now used commonly to describe different players, and was made popular by former ESPN Sportscaster Dan Patrick, albeit jokingly, using the line to describe marginal competitors.

== Personal life ==
Rote and his first wife, Elizabeth Jeanette Jamison, married in 1949 and had four children – Kyle, Gary, Chris, and Elizabeth. His oldest son, Kyle Rote, Jr., was one of the first notable soccer stars from the United States. He said of his father, "To me the most remarkable thing about him from a football standpoint was that he had fourteen teammates who named their sons after him." In 1965, Rote married Sharon Ritchie (Miss America 1956); they were divorced in 1973. Rote married Betty-Nina Langmack in 1976. He died of a heart attack in Baltimore, Maryland on August 15, 2002, at the age of 73.

Rote was the cousin of Tobin Rote, a multi-championship winning and record holding AFL and NFL quarterback.

Rote authored the books, Pro Football for the Fans and The Language of Pro Football, and wrote the Giants Fight Song. He also published two volumes of poetry, was an ASCAP songwriter, accomplished pianist, and oil painter having a number of his works shown at museums throughout the United States.

There is a Kyle Rote Street in San Antonio, Texas.

== NFL career statistics ==
Legend
| | Won NFL championship |
| **Bold** | Career high |

=== Regular season ===
| Year | Team | Games | | Receiving | | | | | Rushing | | | | | |
| Year | Team | GP | GS | Rec | Yds | Avg | Lng | TD | Att | Yds | Avg | Y/G | Lng | TD |
|---|---|---|---|---|---|---|---|---|---|---|---|---|---|---|
| 1951 | NYG | 5 | 5 | 8 | 62 | 7.8 | 18 | 0 | 21 | 114 | 5.4 | 22.8 | 31 | 1 |
| 1952 | NYG | 12 | 3 | 21 | 240 | 11.4 | 26 | 2 | **103** | **421** | 4.1 | **35.1** | **52** | **2** |
| 1953 | NYG | 9 | 7 | 26 | 440 | 16.9 | **75** | 5 | 63 | 213 | 3.4 | 23.7 | 18 | 1 |
| 1954 | NYG | 11 | 8 | 29 | 551 | 19.0 | 63 | 2 | 30 | 59 | 2.0 | 5.4 | 14 | 0 |
| 1955 | NYG | 12 | 4 | 31 | 580 | 18.7 | 71 | 8 | 10 | 46 | 4.6 | 3.8 | 14 | 0 |
| 1956 | NYG | 12 | 7 | 28 | 405 | 14.5 | 31 | 4 | 3 | 5 | 1.7 | 0.4 | 3 | 0 |
| 1957 | NYG | 12 | 12 | 25 | 358 | 14.3 | 33 | 3 | 1 | 13 | **13.0** | 1.1 | 13 | 0 |
| 1958 | NYG | 12 | 11 | 12 | 244 | **20.3** | 44 | 3 | – | – | – | – | – | – |
| 1959 | NYG | 10 | 10 | 25 | 362 | 14.5 | 34 | 4 | – | – | – | – | – | – |
| 1960 | NYG | 12 | 11 | 42 | 750 | 17.9 | 71 | **10** | – | – | – | – | – | – |
| 1961 | NYG | 14 | 14 | **53** | **805** | 15.2 | 57 | 7 | – | – | – | – | – | – |
| Career | | 121 | 92 | 300 | 4,797 | 16.0 | 75 | 48 | 231 | 871 | 3.8 | 7.2 | 52 | 4 |

== See also ==
- History of the New York Giants (1925–1978)

| Preceded by Johnny Lujack | The NFL Today (as NFL Kickoff) host 1962–1963 | Succeeded by Analysts for game in viewing area |
| Preceded by Paul Christman | NFL on NBC lead analyst 1968–1970 | Succeeded by Al DeRogatis |
| Preceded by Paul Christman | Super Bowl television color commentator (AFC package carrier); 1968-1970 | Succeeded by Al DeRogatis |
