= Victoria Price (disambiguation) =

Victoria Price (born 1962) is an American public speaker and author.

Victoria Price might also refer to:

- Victoria Price (journalist), a reporter for WHDH
- Victoria Price, a woman who accused the Scottsboro Boys of raping her
