= History of Monday Night Football =

The following article details the history of Monday Night Football, the weekly broadcast of National Football League games on American television.

== Pre-1970 ==
In 1948 and 1950, ABC televised the National Football League Championship Game. Harry Wismer provided commentary for the game in 1948 and the game in 1950 joined by Red Grange and Joe Hasel.

ABC first broadcast regular season National Football League games in 1953, supplementing the DuMont Television Network's NFL coverage. While DuMont focused on the New York Giants and Pittsburgh Steelers due to their respective markets having a DuMont O&O (WABD and WDTV, respectively), ABC focused on Chicago Bears home games and Chicago Cardinals home games. Beginning in 1954, ABC added Washington Redskins home games, taking those from DuMont, who replaced them with the Philadelphia Eagles despite Philadelphia (unlike Washington with WTTG) not having a DuMont O&O. In ABC's final year of their initial go around with the National Football League, they added Los Angeles Rams and San Francisco 49ers games (for the Pacific Time Zone affiliates) to go along with their coverage of the Bears and Cardinals. Wire accounts found in newspaperarchive.com indicated that the Washington-Philadelphia game in Week 2 of the 1953 season, was to have been regionally televised by ABC, but the cables needed for the telecast never arrived. The articles said that NFL Commissioner Bert Bell was "fuming" over the incident.

For the Chicago-based games, ABC used Red Grange and Bill Fay on commentary. When ABC added the Redskins to their schedule in 1954, they used Bob Wolff and Dutch Bergman. For games featuring the 49ers and the Rams in 1955, ABC used Bob Kelley plus Bill Brundige on the Rams telecast. Bob Fouts and Frankie Albert were on the commentary for 49ers games. Although for the first two weeks of the 1955 season, the roles were reversed. In the event that the 49ers were in Chicago to play the Bears (which occurred in Week 3 of the 1955 season on October 8), then ABC would use Red Grange and Bill Fay. However, on November 13 (Week 8 of the 1955 season), when the Rams traveled to Chicago to face the Bears, ABC employed a split-commentary concept with Bob Kelley and Bill Brundige calling the game for viewers in Pacific areas and Red Grange and Bill Fay calling the game for viewers in the Midwest. If the 49ers were in Los Angeles to play the Rams (like in Week 7 of the 1955 season), then they used Bob Fouts and Frankie Albert.

ABC's relationship with the NFL at this point pretty much ended when CBS began carrying regular season games across its network nationwide in 1956. This came off the heels of the NFL's previous principal network TV partner, the DuMont Network, suspending its operations. Less than five years later however, ABC became the initial network television partner for the American Football League. The deal called for ABC to broadcast approximately 37 regular season games, the AFL Championship Game and the AFL All-Star Game. These games were typically broadcast regionally on 15 consecutive Sundays and on Thanksgiving Day. This became the first ever cooperative television plan for professional football, in which the proceeds of the contract were divided equally among member clubs; the National Football League would follow suit in 1961, a move that required Congress to pass the Sports Broadcasting Act of 1961 to accommodate such collective broadcasting contracts.

=== Monday night National Football League games prior to 1970 ===
During the early 1960s, NFL Commissioner Pete Rozelle envisioned the possibility of playing at least one game weekly during prime time that could be viewed by a greater television audience (while the NFL had scheduled Saturday night games on the DuMont Television Network in 1953 and 1954, poor ratings and the dissolution of DuMont led to those games being eliminated by the time CBS took over the rights in 1956). An early bid by the league in 1964 to play on Friday nights was soundly defeated, with critics charging that such telecasts would damage the attendance at high school football games, and in any event had been prohibited by the aforementioned Sports Broadcasting Act of 1961 for that very reason alongside Saturday games to protect college football. Undaunted, Rozelle decided to experiment with the concept of playing on Monday night, scheduling the Green Bay Packers and Detroit Lions for a game on September 28, 1964. While the game was not televised, it drew a sellout crowd of 59,203 spectators to Tiger Stadium, the largest crowd ever to watch a professional football game in Detroit up to that point.

Two years later, Rozelle would build on this success as the NFL began a four-year experiment of playing on Monday night, scheduling one game in prime time on CBS during the 1966 and 1967 seasons, and two contests during each of the next two years. NBC followed suit in 1968 and 1969 with games involving American Football League teams.

=== Negotiations with ABC ===
During subsequent negotiations on a new television contract that would begin in 1970 (coinciding with the completion of a merger between the NFL and AFL), Rozelle concentrated on signing a weekly Monday night deal with one of the three major networks. After sensing reluctance from both NBC and CBS in disturbing their regular programming schedules, Rozelle spoke with ABC.

Despite the network's status at the time as the lowest-rated of the three major broadcast networks, ABC was also reluctant to enter the risky venture. It was only after Rozelle used the threat of signing a deal with the independent Hughes Sports Network, an entity bankrolled by reclusive businessman Howard Hughes, did ABC sign a contract for the scheduled games. Speculation was that had Rozelle signed with Hughes, many ABC affiliates would have pre-empted the network's Monday lineup in favor of the games, severely damaging potential ratings.

After the final contract for Monday Night Football was signed, ABC Sports producer Roone Arledge immediately saw possibilities for the new program. Setting out to create an entertainment "spectacle" as much as a simple sports broadcast, Arledge hired Chet Forte, who would serve as director of the program for over 22 years. Arledge also ordered twice the usual number of cameras to cover the game, expanded the regular two-man broadcasting booth to three, and used extensive graphic design within the show as well as instant replay.

== 1970–1985: Founding era ==
Prior to 1978, Monday night games were not scheduled in the final week (Week 14) of the regular season. From 1974 to 1977, a Saturday night game was scheduled for Week 14 and televised live by ABC in lieu of a game on Monday night.

=== Cosell, Jackson, and Meredith ===
Looking for a lightning rod to garner attention, Arledge hired controversial New York City sportscaster Howard Cosell as a commentator, along with veteran football play-by-play announcer Keith Jackson. Arledge had tried to draw in Curt Gowdy and then Vin Scully to ABC for the MNF play-by-play role, but settled for Jackson after they proved unable to break their respective existing contracts with NBC Sports and the Los Angeles Dodgers. Jack Buck was also considered, but when Arledge assistant Chuck Howard telephoned Buck with the job offer, Buck refused to respond due to anger at his treatment by ABC during an earlier stint with the network. Arledge's original choice for the third member of the trio, Frank Gifford, was unavailable since he was still under contract to CBS Sports. However, Gifford suggested former Dallas Cowboys quarterback Don Meredith, setting the stage for years of fireworks between the often-pompous Cosell and the laid-back Meredith.

Monday Night Football first aired on ABC on September 21, 1970, with a game between the New York Jets and the Browns in Cleveland. Advertisers were charged US$65,000 per minute by ABC during the clash, a cost that proved to be a bargain when the contest collected 33% of the viewing audience. The Browns defeated the Jets, 31–21 in a game which featured a 94-yard kickoff return for a touchdown by the Browns' Homer Jones to open the second half, and was punctuated when Billy Andrews intercepted Joe Namath late in the fourth quarter and returned it 25 yards for the clinching touchdown. However, Cleveland viewers saw different programming on WEWS-TV, because of the NFL's blackout rules of the time (this would apply for all games through the end of the 1972 season; beginning in 1973, home games could be televised if tickets were sold out 72 hours before kickoff).

One of the trademarks of Monday Night Football is a music cue used during the opening teasers of each program, a Johnny Pearson-composition titled "Heavy Action", originally a KPM production library cue (and also used as the theme music for the BBC program Superstars), which MNF began using in 1975.

Cosell's presence initially caused Henry Ford II, chairman of the Ford Motor Company, the program's main sponsor, to ask for his removal. ABC refused, and Ford had a change of heart once the show's ratings were made public. Cosell dodged another controversy when he appeared to be intoxicated on-air during the November 23 game between the New York Giants and Philadelphia Eagles. Already ill, Cosell drank at a promotional party prior to the game, then ended up vomiting on Don Meredith's cowboy boots near the end of the first half. Jackson and Meredith ended up announcing the rest of the contest.

=== Cosell, Gifford, and Meredith ===
In 1971, Frank Gifford became available after his contract with CBS Sports expired; Arledge brought him to ABC to serve as play-by-play announcer, replacing Jackson (who returned to broadcasting college football for the network, which he continued to do for the next 35 seasons). The former New York Giant had been an NFL analyst for CBS during the 1960s but had never called play-by-play prior to joining Monday Night Football. In that capacity for Monday Night Football from 1971 to 1985, Gifford was often criticized for his see-no-evil approach in regard to discussing the NFL, earning him the dubious nickname "Faultless Frank." Regardless, Gifford would have the longest tenure of any broadcaster on the show, lasting until 1998.

Cosell's abrasive personality gave him enough recognition to host a live variety show on ABC in the fall of 1975. That show is remembered today only as a trivia question, as its title, Saturday Night Live, prevented a new late-night sketch comedy program on NBC from using that title until the ABC show was canceled. That seeming popularity was in contrast to the repeated criticisms in the media, as well as bar room contests in which winners were allowed to throw a brick through a television image of Cosell.

After beginning with critical acclaim, Meredith began to take his weekly assignments less seriously, while also beginning an acting career. By 1973, his motivation for the broadcasts seemed highly suspect, given incidents during a trio of contests. On October 29, Meredith was drinking during the Buffalo Bills–Kansas City Chiefs game, which was preceded one week earlier by his pre-game analysis of the Denver Broncos–Oakland Raiders game: "We're in the Mile High City and I sure am" – a not-so-subtle reference to his use of marijuana at the time. Finally, during the Pittsburgh Steelers–Washington Redskins game on November 5, he referred to U.S. President Richard Nixon as "Tricky Dick".

=== Cosell, Gifford, Williamson, and Karras ===
Don Meredith would be absent from Monday Night Football for a broadcasting and acting career on rival NBC from 1974 to 1976. Fred Williamson, a former Kansas City Chiefs defensive back nicknamed "The Hammer" for his often-brutal hits, was selected by ABC to replace Meredith in 1974, but following a few pre-season broadcasts, proved so inarticulate that he was relieved of his duties prior to the start of the regular season, becoming the first MNF personality not to last an entire season (much less no part of the regular season at all). Williamson was replaced by fellow Gary, Indiana native Alex Karras, formerly of the Detroit Lions. The highlight of Williamson's MNF career was probably at the introductory press conference where he quipped that he was hired to "bring some color to the booth."

Karras made his debut on September 16, 1974, and immediately made an impact when he jokingly referred to Oakland Raiders' defensive lineman Otis Sistrunk as having attended "The University of Mars." That would essentially be the high point of Karras' three-year tenure, with a developing movie career often distracting him from showing any improvement (in reality, Sistrunk did not attend any college but enlisted in the United States Marine Corps after high school and played semi-professional football before getting a tryout with the Raiders; the Raiders team guide listed his college alma mater as "U.S. Mars").

=== Cosell, Gifford, Meredith, and Tarkenton ===
Meredith returned to the ABC booth in 1977, but seemed to lack the enthusiasm that had marked his first stint from 1970 to 1973. While the NFL moved to a 16-week schedule in 1978, Meredith was contractually obligated to work only 14 games, leaving Cosell and Gifford to work games as a duo or with newly retired Fran Tarkenton beginning in 1979.

From 1978 to 1986, ABC also aired occasional NFL games on Thursday and Sunday nights. Each of these telecasts would be billed by the network as a "Special Thursday/Sunday Night Edition of Monday Night Football".

Cosell and Monday Night Football were so influential in popular culture that an ABC Sports executive proposed a Saturday morning cartoon based on the show. The executive met with Cosell, who refused: "I am the biggest name in show business today. And you want to make a cartoon character out of me?"

One of the more somber contests in the run of the series came on November 27, 1978, when the San Francisco 49ers hosted the Pittsburgh Steelers. Earlier in the day, San Francisco mayor George Moscone and City Supervisor Harvey Milk had been murdered at City Hall. Despite the complaints that followed, the NFL chose to play the game, a decision that mirrored the league's decision to play its scheduled games during the weekend following the assassination of President John F. Kennedy 15 years earlier.

The opening contest of the 1979 season saw a poignant moment as former New England Patriots wide receiver Darryl Stingley was introduced to a sellout crowd at the Patriots' Schaefer Stadium. Stingley had been paralyzed in a preseason game the year before and was making his first visit to the stadium since the accident.

==== 1980 ====
During the 1980 season, Monday Night Football continued its tradition of featuring notable guests during the half-time show, from a variety of different industries and backgrounds. During a Thursday Night Football special in Houston, one month after Ronald Reagan was elected to the White House, vice-president elect George H. W. Bush (who represented portions of Houston in the U.S. House from 1967 to 1970) was interviewed in the broadcast booth at halftime. Prior to the election, none of the candidates were invited on the program due to equal time regulations governing appearances during campaigns at the time. Later that same season in Southern California, movie star Bo Derek, well known for her role in the movie "Ten", was the half-time guest and was interviewed by Howard Cosell. Some of the production crew teasingly referred to the segment as "The Beauty and the Beast".

1980 also marked some key personnel moves for the top-rated ABC show. It was the first season of Monday Night Football produced by Bob Goodrich, who would lead the production team for another 6 years. In addition, 1980 was the first year a woman joined the traveling production crew of over 40 cameramen, engineers, producers and directors. Alexis Denny, then a sophomore at Yale University, served as the stage manager of the telecasts and wrote the script for the half-time highlights that Howard Cosell would voice over in a style for which he was known throughout his career.

===== John Lennon tragedy =====
One of the most remembered moments in Monday Night Football history occurred on December 8, 1980, yet had nothing to do with the game or football in general. During a game between the Miami Dolphins and New England Patriots, Howard Cosell broke the news that former Beatle John Lennon had been shot and killed, news that stunned a nationwide audience.

Yes, we have to say it. Remember, this is just a football game, no matter who wins or loses. An unspeakable tragedy confirmed to us by ABC News in New York City: John Lennon, outside of his apartment building on the West Side of New York City, the most famous perhaps, of all of The Beatles, shot twice in the back, rushed to Roosevelt Hospital, dead ... on ... arrival.

In December 1974, Lennon had appeared in the Monday Night Football broadcast booth and was briefly interviewed by Cosell. Reagan, then the outgoing Governor of California, was interviewed by Gifford during the same game.

==== 1982 contract renewal ====
The NFL's television contract renewal in 1982 also put ABC in the Super Bowl rotation for the first time, giving it the broadcast rights to Super Bowl XIX in 1985. A second renewal of the television contract gave them the rights to Super Bowl XXII in 1988.

From 1983 to 1986, ABC also aired a Friday night game in the final week (Week 16) of the regular season, in addition to the normal Monday night game.

=== Cosell, Gifford, Meredith, and Simpson ===
Cosell continued to draw criticism during Monday Night Football with one of his offhand comments during the September 5, 1983 game, igniting a controversy and laying the groundwork for his departure at the end of that season. In a game between the Washington Redskins and Dallas Cowboys, Cosell referred to Alvin Garrett, an African American wide receiver for the Redskins, as a "little monkey." Cosell noted that Garrett's small stature, and not his race, was the basis for his comment, citing the fact that he had used the term to describe his grandchildren. Later, a special on Howard Cosell showed him calling Mike Adamle (a white player) a "little monkey." Stung by the unrelenting barrage of remarks, Cosell claimed upon his departure from Monday Night Football that the NFL had become "a stagnant bore." In Cosell's book, I Never Played the Game, he devoted an entire chapter ("Monkey Business") to the Garrett episode. In the book, Cosell also said that ABC should have had the right to choose its own Monday Night schedule. In his mind, Monday Night Football is what elevated the NFL in popularity over Major League Baseball. He felt that this should have been ABC's reward for raising the league's profile.

That same year, O. J. Simpson replaced Tarkenton as a fill-in when Meredith or Cosell, who also was a broadcaster for the network's coverage of the Major League Baseball playoffs, was unavailable. The season would serve as a study in contrasts as one of the most exciting Monday night games ever was followed the next week by one of the most badly played in the run of the series. On October 17, 1983, the second highest scoring game in Monday Night Football history took place in the Green Bay Packers-Washington Redskins game, with the Packers winning the game by a score of 48–47. One week later, the New York Giants and St. Louis Cardinals played for more than four hours before settling for a 20–20 overtime tie, MNF's only OT tie ever. The deadlock had come after dropped touchdown passes by Cardinal wide receivers Willard Harrell and Roy Green, and a trio of missed field goals by teammate Neil O'Donoghue, including two in the final 63 seconds of the overtime period.

=== Gifford, Meredith, and Simpson ===
When Cosell left prior to the start of the 1984 season, the trio of Gifford, Meredith and Simpson handled the duties. Cosell's departure seemed to have the greatest effect on Meredith, who many believed to be a poor analyst in his absence. Falling ratings also gave indications that much of the mystique that surrounded the weekly event had disappeared.

=== Gifford, Simpson, and Namath ===
After the 1984 season, ABC replaced Meredith with Joe Namath the following year, with the quarterback making his debut in the annual Pro Football Hall of Fame Game. In a coincidental twist, both Namath and Simpson were busy prior to the telecast with their induction into the shrine.

One of the more grisly moments in Monday Night Football history occurred during a game between the Washington Redskins and New York Giants on November 18, 1985, at RFK Stadium. Redskins quarterback Joe Theismann's career would end when Giants linebacker Lawrence Taylor reached from behind to drag him down and Taylor fell heavily on the quarterback's leg in the process. On the play, which viewers could see in a gruesome slow-motion replay, Theismann suffered a compound fracture of the tibia and fibula in his lower right leg. The injury ended the playing career of Theismann, who had teamed with Gifford and Meredith on ABC's coverage of Super Bowl XIX in January 1985.

Two weeks after that painful memory, the program's most watched contest took place as the previously unbeaten Chicago Bears were defeated by the Miami Dolphins, who had not lost to a National Football Conference (NFC) team at home since 1976. That 38–24 loss would turn out to be Chicago's only one in 1985. The game broadcast earned a Nielsen rating of 29.6 with a 46 share.

== 1986–2005: Al Michaels era ==
Both Namath and Simpson would be replaced at the end of the 1985 NFL season, with critics noting their lack of journalistic skills in comparison to Cosell (both landed at NBC). In their place the following year came veteran broadcaster Al Michaels, who had previously anchored ABC's pregame coverage of Super Bowl XIX, and had been the lead play-by-play announcer of Monday Night Baseball since 1983. Michaels had also by this point, gained much acclaim at ABC for his 1980 "Miracle on Ice" broadcast.

=== Gifford and Michaels ===
Michaels served as the play-by-play announcer, teaming with Gifford for a two-man booth in 1986. During that season, the Miami Dolphins again made records with the biggest blowout in Monday Night Football history in a 45–3 rout of the then 10-1 New York Jets (the record was later tied and subsequently broken in 2005; see below). Also in 1986, when Al Michaels became unavailable because he was calling Major League Baseball's League Championship Series, Frank Gifford moved up into the play-by-play spot while Lynn Swann or O. J. Simpson filled-in as the color commentator. Gifford would once again call the play-by-play when Michaels was busy calling the World Series in 1987 and 1989 and the National League Championship Series in 1988.

=== Gifford, Michaels, and Dierdorf ===
In 1987, Gifford and Michaels were joined by Dan Dierdorf, returning the series to its original concept of three announcers in the booth. The trio would last for 11 seasons through the conclusion of the 1997 season making them the longest tenured broadcast team in the history of Monday Night Football. In 1990, television composer Edd Kalehoff created a new arrangement of Johnny Pearson's "Heavy Action", by that time fully synonymous with the series. This more or less replaced an original composition by Charles Fox. Also debuting in 1989 was Hank Williams, Jr. performing "All My Rowdy Friends Are Here on Monday Night", sung to the music of his 1984 hit "All My Rowdy Friends Are Coming Over Tonight."

==== 1989 contract renewal ====
As part of the league's television contract renewal with the network in 1989, ABC was awarded the television rights to Super Bowl XXV and Super Bowl XXIX, and the first round of NFL playoffs. The Monday Night Football announcing team anchored the telecasts, except for the first of two Wild Card Playoff games, in which ESPN's Sunday Night NFL crew of Mike Patrick and Joe Theismann presided over that telecast. However, the original crew for one of the two Wild Card Playoff games from 1990 to 1995 consisted of Brent Musburger and Dick Vermeil (both of whom did college football broadcasts for ABC during those two seasons).

From 1990 until 2005, ABC's MNF television package included seventeen (eighteen in 1992 and 1993) regular season games (from 2003 until 2005, a Thursday game and 16 Mondays – no game on Week 17 because of playoff preparation disadvantages), the first two wild card playoff games (held on the first Saturday of the playoffs), and at times, the AFC–NFC Pro Bowl.

==== 1994 ====
The October 17, 1994 episode between the Kansas City Chiefs and Denver Broncos featured a duel between two future Hall of Fame quarterbacks, Joe Montana and John Elway. With 1:29 left to play in the game, Elway scored on a 4-yard touchdown run to put the Broncos ahead 28–24. But then Montana led the Chiefs on a 75-yard drive to score the game-winning touchdown with just 8 seconds to play. The Chiefs defeated the Broncos 31–28.

The October 31, 1994 game between the Green Bay Packers and Chicago Bears is notable for a very windy and rainy game, and also remembered with a 36-yard touchdown run by Brett Favre, who had a sore hip that night. Later dubbed the "Halloween Monsoon" by Bears fans, the Packers crushed the Bears, 33–6.

==== 1995 ====
In the 1995 MNF regular season opener between the Dallas Cowboys and New York Giants at the New Jersey Meadowlands, Cowboys owner Jerry Jones controversially brought Nike chairman Phil Knight down to the sidelines, representing Jones' individual deal with Nike, contrary to the NFL's policy at the time of negotiating its marketing deals as a league (it wasn't until 2002 that the league's first league-wide uniform contract with Reebok was made; Nike would replace Reebok in that capacity in 2012).

==== 1997 ====
In 1997, ABC began using a scoring bug showing the game clock and score throughout the entire broadcast.

=== Michaels, Dierdorf, and Esiason ===
In 1998, Lesley Visser became the first female commentator on Monday Night Football. She had been the first female beat writer in the NFL when she covered the New England Patriots for the Boston Globe in the mid-1970s, and was the first and only woman to handle a Super Bowl Trophy presentation when she was a sportscaster with CBS. Visser was followed by several women, notably Melissa Stark and Lisa Guerrero, on the sideline who were perceived as "eye candy", none of whom affected the ratings.

For the 1998 season, ABC pushed Monday Night Football back an hour (it has usually aired at 9:00 p.m. Eastern Time). A special pre-game show was created, Monday Night Blast, hosted by Chris Berman from the ESPN Zone restaurant in Baltimore. The game would start around 8:20 p.m. Eastern for this particular season. Despite leaving the booth, Frank Gifford stayed on one more year as a special contributor to the pre-game show, usually presenting a single segment.

Nielsen ratings data for the first 17 weeks of the 1998–99 television season showed that Monday Night Football averaged a 13.9 rating, down 8% from the 15.0 average rating for the broadcasts in 1997 – the previous standard in ratings futility. In actuality, MNF ratings had been hitting all-time record lows for the previous four years.

=== Michaels and Esiason ===
Beginning in 1999, Monday Night Football telecasts used a computer-generated yellow line to mark where a team needs to get a first down, a method first used by ABC sister cable channel ESPN. 1999 also saw the Pro Football Hall of Fame Game being moved from Saturday afternoon to Monday night. It would remain on Monday night through 2005.

Boomer Esiason replaced Gifford in 1998, and Dierdorf left for a return to CBS in 1999. Esiason's relationship with Michaels was questioned leading to his firing. Esiason and Michaels reportedly never got along, and it led to ABC firing Esiason shortly after calling Super Bowl XXXIV together.

=== Michaels, Fouts, and Miller ===
==== 2000 ====
Unexpectedly, comedian Dennis Miller joined the cast in 2000, along with Dan Fouts. The move was ultimately regarded as a bust by many viewers and commentators. ABC briefly considered adding radio personality Rush Limbaugh before Miller was added to the broadcast team, despite having no prior sports broadcast experience (Limbaugh would instead be assigned as a commentator to Sunday NFL Countdown on ABC sister ESPN). Miller demonstrated a knowledge of the game and its personalities, although at times he tended to lapse into sometimes obscure analogy-riddled streams of consciousness similar to the "rants" of his standup comedy act. ABC even set up a webpage dedicated to explaining Miller's sometimes obscure pop culture references. Soon, it would become apparent that Miller's comedy did not mix with football.

In June 2000, Lesley Visser's career suffered a highly publicized setback when she was famously bounced as the Monday Night Football sideline reporter for a less experienced, much younger woman and a man, who did not have as extensive journalistic credentials as Visser. "It was staggering to me", Visser later recalled. However, she wound up returning to CBS Sports, philosophical as ever. "You can have a short career if it's based on looks and youth", she said, "but legitimacy is what lasts." Which ABC replaced her with both Melissa Stark and Eric Dickerson. This was part of the overhaul when ABC brought back Don Ohlmeyer to serve as producer, who installed Dennis Miller as an analyst (for ultimately two unsuccessful seasons). She sued ABC Sports for age discrimination, with Howard Katz and Ohlmeyer being named as co-defendants.

As previously mentioned, in 2000, Don Ohlmeyer, the program's producer up until 1977 was brought back. After spending time at NBC, Ohlmeyer was lured out of retirement to spark interest and provide some vigor to the broadcast. Besides the on-air talent, Ohlmeyer's changes included clips of players introducing themselves, new graphics and music. In another rather irreverent move, the scoring bug began incorporating nicknames for the teams, such as "Skins" and "Fins" (for the Washington Redskins and Miami Dolphins) instead of their respective common abbreviations, WSH and MIA.

On October 23, 2000, the New York Jets and Miami Dolphins competed in what is now known as The Monday Night Miracle. Trailing 30–7 in the fourth quarter, Vinny Testaverde led the Jets to score 23 consecutive points to tie the game. After Miami scored another touchdown, Testaverde threw to offensive tackle Jumbo Elliott to tie the game at 37-all. At 1:08 a.m. Eastern Time, the game having crossed into Tuesday morning, John Hall kicked a field goal in overtime to win the game 40–37. It was the second biggest fourth quarter comeback in NFL history and biggest comeback in Jets' history. Arnold Schwarzenegger predicted the comeback at halftime, where he was appearing with the MNF crew to promote his upcoming movie, The 6th Day. With the Jets already down by 20 points he said, "Wayne Chrebet will catch a pass and the Jets will win. They're a great team." Two weeks later the Green Bay Packers defeated their division rival the Minnesota Vikings 26–20 in overtime, with the winning touchdown by Antonio Freeman prompting Michaels to say "He did WHAT?!" (Freeman had caught a tipped ball while on his side, with the ball never touching the ground, and was never touched by the nearby defender).

==== 2001 ====
The 2001 season of MNF featured a season-long campaign promoting the anticipated 20,000th point scored in MNF history. Denver Broncos kicker Jason Elam completed the task with a field goal during a 38–28 loss at Oakland on November 5. The three points also put Elam over 1,000 points for his career. In addition, the scoring bug reverted to using the team abbreviations, as opposed to the nickname scheme used in the previous season.

=== Michaels and Madden ===
In 2002, both Dennis Miller and Dan Fouts were dropped and John Madden joined Al Michaels in a two-man booth. Madden was a coach for the Oakland Raiders, namesake of the seminal Madden NFL video game series, and a successful broadcaster for 21 years – first with CBS until 1993 and then with Fox – before joining Monday Night Football.

==== 2002 ====
In 2002, the broadcast debuted the "Horse Trailer" award, in which a picture of the game's top performer(s) is displayed, as chosen by the broadcasting crew. During the fourth quarter of a preseason game early that season, Madden was joking about doing some recording in the "Horse Trailer", a term the producers used for one of the ABC production trucks. It was, in fact, a custom-built trailer designed from the shell of a horse trailer, but housed sophisticated electronic equipment inside it. By the first week of the regular season, an idea to decorate the plain white trailer with MNF decor, the entire MNF schedule, and a weekly MVP, was born. Immediately following each game, the winner(s) is chosen, and his picture is affixed to the trailer in the corresponding location. When Madden and Michaels went to NBC in 2006, they debuted a similar feature, the Rock Star – in which the photo of the player of the game was attached to the top of 30 Rockefeller Plaza in New York City (the "Horse Trailer" concept was reinstated for the 2007 season).

In addition to Michaels and Madden helming the regular season broadcasts, Brent Musburger and Gary Danielson served as commentators for that year's AFC wild card game, with Jack Arute serving as the sideline reporter.

After suffering through several years of dismal Pro Bowl ratings, ABC considered moving the game to Monday night. In February 2003, Madden declined to serve as color commentator for the game in Hawaii, citing his fear of flying; former MNF personality Dan Fouts took his place. The Pro Bowl held the following year was played on a Sunday as typical, but was moved to ABC's sister network ESPN.

==== 2003 ====
In 2003, ABC and the NFL dropped the Monday Night Football game for the final week of the regular season. The move, which had been in effect for the first eight years of the broadcast (1970–1977), was the result of declining ratings, as well as problems involved for potential playoff teams, as there was a potential of only four days rest between their final regular season game and first-round playoff game. ABC replaced the telecast with an opening weekend Thursday night game, and in exchange ESPN got a Saturday night game on the final weekend.

Also during the 2003 season, Lisa Guerrero decided to leave Fox Sports Net's The Best Damn Sports Show Period to join the MNF television crew as a sideline reporter (replacing the pregnant Melissa Stark). Guerrero's performance on the broadcast was heavily criticized, and the following year (also in an apparent move away from the "eye candy" concept) ABC replaced her with longtime television sports journalist Michele Tafoya. Guerrero defended herself by saying that the show hired her with the intention of going in a totally different direction with the job of sideline reporter – personality-driven and feature-driven – then discarded all of that and told her to just do the job in the usual fashion. She said that she never would have taken the job if she had known that they would change their minds like that. In 2005, Michele Tafoya sat out much of the season while on maternity leave, with Sam Ryan temporarily taking her place.

During the October 6, 2003 game between the Indianapolis Colts and Tampa Bay Buccaneers, Indianapolis was trailing 35–14 with 3:43 remaining. The Colts had returned a Tampa Bay kickoff 90 yards to the 11-yard line, setting up a quick score. The Colts recovered an onside kick and scored again to narrow the margin to 35–28. They forced a Buccaneers punt and with less than two minutes remaining, Peyton Manning led an 87-yard drive to score the game-tying touchdown with 35 seconds left in regulation. In overtime, kicker Mike Vanderjagt missed a 40-yard field goal, but Simeon Rice was called for a leaping penalty, a rarely seen unsportsmanlike conduct infraction that penalizes a player for running and jumping to block a kick and landing on other players. Vanderjagt's subsequent kick was batted and hit the upright, but fell in good, winning the game for the Colts. Vanderjagt went on to become the second kicker in NFL history not to miss either a field goal or extra point in a single season after Gary Anderson, who accomplished the feat in the 1998 season as a member of the Minnesota Vikings. Vanderjagt did not miss a kick in the playoffs either, making him the first kicker to accomplish that feat (Anderson missed a field goal in the 1998 NFC Championship Game).

On December 22, 2003, Green Bay Packers quarterback Brett Favre put on one of the most defining moments of his career (while also ranking among his greatest games ever). The day before the contest against the Oakland Raiders, his father, Irvin, died suddenly of a heart attack. Favre elected to play, passing for four touchdowns in the first half, and 399 yards for the game in a 41–7 destruction of the Raiders (receiving applause from the highly partisan "Raider Nation"). Afterwards, Brett said,

I knew that my dad would have wanted me to play. I love him so much and I love this game. It's meant a great deal to me, to my dad, to my family, and I didn't expect this kind of performance. But I know he was watching tonight.

==== 2004 ====
On November 15, 2004, controversy shrouded Philadelphia Eagles wide receiver Terrell Owens when he appeared with actress Nicollette Sheridan (one of the stars of the new hit ABC comedy-drama Desperate Housewives) in an introductory skit which opened that evening's MNF telecast, in which Owens and the Eagles played the Cowboys at Texas Stadium. The skit was widely condemned as being sexually suggestive (see video) and ABC was forced to apologize for airing it (the Eagles went on to win the game, 49–21, with Owens catching three touchdown passes). However, on March 14, 2005, the Federal Communications Commission (FCC) ruled that the skit did not violate decency standards, because it contained no outright nudity or foul language. Originally, John Madden was supposed to appear in the commercial.

==== 2005 ====
For the 2005 season, which would become ABC's final season as the MNF broadcaster and used through Super Bowl XL, ABC converted its scoring bug into a horizontal time-score banner placed across the bottom of the screen.

===== Monday Night Massacre (Seahawks) =====
On December 5, 2005, in a game dubbed "The Monday Night Massacre" by NFL Films, the Seattle Seahawks shut out the Philadelphia Eagles 42–0 with three defensive touchdowns (two interceptions, one fumble return). This tied the then-largest margin of victory mark in Monday Night Football history and set the mark for the greatest margin of victory in a Monday night shutout. This also set the NFL record for scoring the most points with less than 200 yards of offense. Andre Dyson scored twice for the Seahawks defense, once on a 72-yard interception return and the other on a 25-yard fumble return, earning himself the "Horse Trailer Player of the Game" as well as NFC defensive player of the week. A fourth interception return by Michael Boulware fell just short of tying another Seahawks NFL record of four defensive scores in a single game, set during a 45–0 victory over the Kansas City Chiefs in 1984. The defeat was the Eagles' third-worst in team history, tied for the worst loss in MNF history, and was the worst shutout loss. This was due to the Eagles' major injuries such as star quarterback Donovan McNabb (who was hurt in a Week 10 loss to the Cowboys) and the after-effects of the Terrell Owens saga earlier that year. The Eagles also lost their star running back Brian Westbrook due to an injury in this game.

=== End of the ABC era ===
Despite high ratings, ABC lost millions of dollars on televising the games during the late 1990s and 2000s. The NFL also indicated that it wanted Sunday night to be the new night for its marquee game, because more people tend to watch television on Sundays, and games held on that night would be more conducive to flexible scheduling, a method by which some of the NFL's best games could be moved from the afternoon to the evening on Sunday on short notice. Given these factors, as well as the rise of ABC's ratings on Sunday night, and the network's wish of protecting its Desperate Housewives franchise (which they knew would be costly), on April 18, 2005, ABC and the NFL announced the end of their 36-year partnership, with the Monday Night Football broadcasts being moved to ESPN starting with the 2006 season; the move was criticized by some of the Disney shareholders (as well as NFL fans and purists). However, ESPN's ability to collect subscription fees from cable and satellite providers, in addition to selling commercials, made it more likely that ESPN could turn a profit on NFL telecasts, as opposed to ABC's heavy losses.

The final Monday Night Football broadcast on ABC aired on December 26, 2005, when the New York Jets hosted the New England Patriots from Giants Stadium. Coincidentally, both the first and last ABC Monday Night Football game telecasts ended with a score of 31–21 with the Jets on the losing end. Vinny Testaverde holds the distinction of throwing the last touchdown pass in ABC's MNF telecast history; it was to wide receiver Laveranues Coles. Also, Testaverde's pass set an NFL record: most consecutive seasons with a touchdown pass, 19 seasons (1987–2005). Patriots linebacker Mike Vrabel set a record of note during that last ABC telecast, becoming the first player to catch two touchdown passes and record a quarterback sack in the same game. The final play of the ABC era was a Patriots kneeldown by 44-year-old reserve quarterback Doug Flutie. John Madden said at the show's ending:

They can take football away from ABC on Monday nights, but they can't take away the memories.

During its final NFL television contract, ABC was awarded the telecasts to Super Bowl XXXIV, Super Bowl XXXVII and Super Bowl XL. With the end of ABC's contract, the Super Bowl XL broadcast was the network's final NFL telecast until 2016, when they simulcasted ESPN's Wild Card game production. To replace Monday Night Football, ABC turned its series of primetime college football specials, which had run until 1975 and again from 1990 to 1993 and from 1996 onward, into a regular series. The network also acquired the rights to the CMA Awards ceremony. The Monday after ABC's final Monday Night game saw the premiere of season 2 of Dancing with the Stars.

== 2006–present: ESPN era ==
=== Move to ESPN ===
The changes to the NFL's prime time broadcasts took place with the 2006 season, as ESPN began airing the Monday night games at the same time NBC assumed the rights to the Sunday night package from ESPN. The Sunday night game is now the "showcase" game of the week on the NFL schedule.

While the ESPN broadcasts still carry the MNF name and heritage, NBC (like ABC) is a broadcast network, whereas ESPN is a cable channel not freely available to all Americans, though per a clause in the NFL's broadcasting rules, many ESPN games air on a participating broadcast television station in the home markets of each team to allow viewers who do not subscribe to a pay television provider to view the game. For that reason, NBC gained rights to the Thursday night season-opening game, the Wild Card doubleheader that has traditionally aired on ABC, as well as a share of the rotating rights to the Super Bowl (with CBS and Fox also in the mix).

ESPN had initially stated that its MNF team would consist of Al Michaels and Joe Theismann in the booth, with Michele Tafoya and Suzy Kolber serving as sideline reporters. However, on February 8, 2006, ESPN announced that former NBA studio host Mike Tirico would replace Michaels in the booth in 2006, joined by Theismann, and Tony Kornheiser. ESPN announced the following day that it had "traded" the contract of Michaels to NBC in exchange for some NBCUniversal properties, including rights to Ryder Cup coverage, and the return of the rights to Oswald the Lucky Rabbit (a Walt Disney creation) to ESPN parent The Walt Disney Company after nearly 80 years of Universal ownership.

==== Secondary broadcast teams ====
From 2006 to 2020, ESPN broadcast two games in a doubleheader on the opening week of the season, with the second game using separate announcers and production staff that are not used for the rest of the schedule. On September 11, 2006, the announcers for the second game were Brad Nessler, Ron Jaworski and Dick Vermeil. On September 10, 2007, the team of Mike Greenberg and Mike Golic (co-hosts of Mike and Mike in the Morning) presided alongside Mike Ditka. For both games, Bonnie Bernstein was the sideline reporter.

Greenberg, Golic and Ditka served as the secondary team for the September 8, 2008 game, with Suzy Kolber on the sidelines. The September 14, 2009 game had Steve Young join Greenberg, Golic and Kolber. On September 13, 2010, Nessler and Trent Dilfer teamed to call the second game, with Kolber again on the sidelines. On September 12, 2011, Nessler and Dilfer were joined by Rachel Nichols on the sidelines.

From 2012 to 2016, Chris Berman and Dilfer served as the No. 2 team during opening week, with Nichols (2012), Sal Paolantonio (2013) and Lindsay Czarniak (2014–2016) the sideline reporters.

In 2017, Beth Mowins became the second woman to call play-by-play in an NFL game when she called the second game of the MNF doubleheader alongside Rex Ryan and sideline reporter Sergio Dipp. Previously, Gayle Sierens had been the only woman to do so, having called the second game of ESPN's Week 1 Monday Night doubleheader in 1987. Mowins reprised her role in 2018, this time with Brian Griese and Laura Rutledge.

2019's second game was called by Steve Levy, Louis Riddick and Griese. The trio were eventually promoted to the No. 1 MNF team the following season. The sideline reporter was Dianna Russini due to Laura Rutledge was on maternity leave. In 2020, Chris Fowler and Kirk Herbstreit, normally one of the announcing teams in ESPN's college football broadcasts, served as the No. 2 team with Maria Taylor working the sideline.

=== Tirico, Theismann, and Kornheiser ===
ESPN's first Monday night broadcast was a preseason game held on August 14, 2006, when the Oakland Raiders visited the Minnesota Vikings, publicized as the return of Randy Moss to Minnesota for the first time since the Vikings traded him after the 2004 season. The telecast debuted with brand-new graphics, including a time-score box placed in the lower center of the screen; a variation of the MNF graphics began to be used on almost all sporting events televised by ESPN and ABC (the former of which effectively took over full responsibility of ABC's sports division that year, which was rebranded as ESPN on ABC). The first regular season Monday Night Football game to air on ESPN was on September 11, 2006, featuring the visiting Minnesota Vikings at the Washington Redskins at FedExField, in which the Vikings won 19–16.

The September 25 edition of Monday Night Football highlighted the New Orleans Saints' first game back in the Louisiana Superdome following Hurricane Katrina to take on the Atlanta Falcons. The game had a Super Bowl-like atmosphere with performances by the Goo Goo Dolls, U2 and Green Day before the game. The NFL tapped producer Don Mischer and director Hamish Hamilton to produce the event. Former President George H. W. Bush handled the pregame coin toss. The Saints beat the Falcons 23–3 in what now ranks as one of the most-watched events in the history of cable television.

ESPN's October 23, 2006 game telecast between the New York Giants and Dallas Cowboys drew the largest audience in the history of cable television at the time, besting the previous mark set by a 1993 North American Free Trade Agreement (NAFTA) debate between Al Gore and Ross Perot. An average of 16,028,000 viewers (12.8 rating) watched as the Giants defeated the Cowboys, 36–22. ESPN's Monday Night Football telecasts now account for eight of the ten highest-rated programs in cable television history.

What would eventually be named the "NFL's comeback of the year" was played on Monday Night Football on October 16. Late in the third quarter, the massive underdog Arizona Cardinals led the Chicago Bears 23–3. Arizona seemed to have the game wrapped up, as rookie quarterback Matt Leinart was having a great day, and Arizona had forced six turnovers out of Chicago quarterback Rex Grossman. Chicago's defense then went on to score 14 points on fumble returns for touchdowns. With 2:58 left in the fourth quarter, and down 17–23, Chicago's Devin Hester returned a punt for a touchdown to take a 24–23 lead. Leinart then led the Cardinals down the field, only to have Neil Rackers miss a field goal, and Chicago went on to win.

Monday Night Football and its surrounding shoulder programming became the most profitable franchise on cable television.

=== Tirico, Jaworski, and Kornheiser ===
Analyst and former NFL quarterback Ron Jaworski replaced Joe Theismann, who was offered a prominent football analyst job with ESPN, in the booth beginning with the 2007 season.

==== 2007 ====
On December 3, 2007, 17.5 million people watched the undefeated New England Patriots defeat the Baltimore Ravens, 27–24. The game became the most-watched single cable television program of all time by total viewership, breaking the previous record set by the August 17 premiere of High School Musical 2, which was viewed by 17.2 million on ESPN corporate sibling Disney Channel (after the film was surpassed by the Patriots-Ravens game, High School Musical 2 retained the record as the highest-rated non-sports program in basic cable history).

==== 2008 ====
After experiencing low ratings and criticism about the production during the 2007 season, ESPN announced that long-time sideline reporters Suzy Kolber and Michele Tafoya would have reduced roles for the 2008 season.

As the 2008 season began, ESPN announced a new focus on covering the games as sporting events rather than as entertainment and cultural events. Among the changes were the removal of celebrity booth guests and a reduction in the number of sideline interviews. Tafoya and Kolber were retained to conduct those interviews and file reports from the field. In addition, ESPN replaced the bottom center-screen time-score box introduced in 2006 (which was used until the 2008 preseason) with a horizontal time-score banner across the bottom of the screen.

The September 15, 2008 Philadelphia Eagles–Dallas Cowboys game, with a 13.3 rating and 18.6 million viewers, set a new record for the most-watched cable television program, surpassing the record set the previous December by the Patriots-Ravens game.

===== 2008 election eve =====
The night before the 2008 United States Presidential Election, studio host Chris Berman interviewed both major party candidates, Republican nominee John McCain and Democratic nominee Barack Obama at halftime. The November 3, 2008 game featured the Washington Redskins losing to the Pittsburgh Steelers, 23–6.

=== Tirico, Jaworski, and Gruden ===
==== 2009 season ====
Tony Kornheiser stepped down for the 2009 season and was replaced by former Oakland Raiders and Tampa Bay Buccaneers head coach Jon Gruden. The rest of the team remained intact.

The October 5, 2009 Green Bay Packers–Minnesota Vikings game was the fourth ESPN MNF broadcast to become the most-watched program ever on a cable channel, with a 15.3 rating and 21.839 million viewers. The record stood until it was surpassed by the network's telecast of the BCS National Championship Game on January 10, 2011.

==== 2010 season-"Monday Night Massacre" (Eagles) ====
On November 15, 2010, the Philadelphia Eagles visited the Washington Redskins, in what was Donovan McNabb's second game against the Eagles since being traded on April 4 of that year. The Redskins won the first meeting that season by a score of 17–12; however, in the first half of the game, Eagles star quarterback Michael Vick suffered a rib injury knocking him out of the game, resulting in Kevin Kolb taking over. After the game, McNabb gave a post-game speech in the locker room in which he stated the Eagles made a mistake by trading him. Before the game, McNabb signed a five-year contract extension worth $78 million, after being benched in the fourth quarter just a week earlier. The very first play of the game Vick threw an 88-yard touchdown pass to DeSean Jackson.

The Redskins were criticized for their lack of coverage because the Eagles were known for going deep on the first play; the Eagles' next two possessions led to touchdowns. The very first play of the second quarter, with Philadelphia up 28–0, saw Vick throw a 48-yard touchdown to Jeremy Maclin. With Philadelphia up 45–21 at halftime, Vick threw a three-yard touchdown to Jason Avant in the third quarter to make the score 52–21. During the play, Vick scrambled, waiting for someone to get open when Albert Haynesworth (who signed a six-year $100 million contract with the Redskins the year prior) had fallen down and continued to lie on the field as Vick continued to scramble. The very next Redskins possession had McNabb throw a pick six to Dimitri Patterson, helping the Eagles score seven points.

The Redskins went on to score one more touchdown, however their seven-point run was not able to stop Philadelphia, which defeated Washington 59–28. McNabb finished the game with 295 yards on 17 for 31, along with two touchdowns and three interceptions. The Eagles finished with 593 offense yards (setting a new team record); Vick went 20 of 28 for 333 yards throwing four touchdowns, and also ran for 80 yards and two touchdowns on eight carries. He became the first player with at least 300 yards passing, 50 yards rushing four passing touchdowns and two rushing touchdowns in a game. Vick's performance in the game also moved him past Steve Young for second place on the all-time list for rushing yards by a quarterback.

==== 2011 season ====
With Suzy Kolber reassigned to the new studio show NFL32, and Michele Tafoya having left ESPN for NBC Sunday Night Football, the sideline reporter position rotated between various reporters for the season.

For the second year in a row, and the third time overall, the beginning of the 10:15 p.m. Eastern Time game (Oakland Raiders at Denver Broncos) was shown on ESPN2 as the game that began at 7:00 pm. Eastern Time (New England Patriots at Miami Dolphins) ran past the scheduled time period.

=== Hank Williams Jr. controversy ===
On October 3, 2011, Hank Williams Jr. made controversial remarks during an interview on Fox News Channel's Fox & Friends, when talking about a golf outing he went on that summer with Barack Obama, John Boehner, Joe Biden and John Kasich. Williams compared President Obama and Speaker of the House Boehner golfing together to "Hitler playing golf with [Israeli prime minister] Netanyahu", stressing their philosophical and political differences. On October 6, 2011, ESPN subsequently announced that it would stop using "All My Rowdy Friends" as its theme song (as the song is still owned by Williams) and drop Williams from the show's opening. Williams commented on the matter: "After reading hundreds of e-mails, I have made my decision... By pulling my opening October 3, [ESPN] stepped on the toes of the First Amendment Freedom of Speech, so therefore me, my song, and All My Rowdy Friends are out of here. It's been a great run." MNF was absent an opening sequence from Week 4 through the end of that season.

In 2017, ESPN re-hired Hank Williams Jr. for the intro.

=== Tirico and Gruden ===
Color commentator Jaworski left the MNF booth after five seasons. As a result, Jon Gruden became the solo color commentator, with MNF going back to a two-man booth for the first time since its final season on ABC (2005). In addition Lisa Salters was named the permanent solo sideline reporter, a role she retained since. ESPN also added a rules analyst to aid in crucial officiating calls, with Gerald Austin filling in the role.

Starting in 2014, ESPN was given the rights to broadcast one Wild Card playoff game. The following season, ESPN's playoff telecasts became simulcast to ABC, marking the network's first NFL broadcasts since the 2005 season.

The Tirico–Gruden pairing would last until 2015, when Tirico left ESPN for NBC Sports in June 2016. It also marked the beginning of a decline in quality for MNF, as it suffered low ratings, unfavorable criticisms over subsequent commentary teams, and a lack of compelling matchups (especially during the final eight weeks leading up to the playoffs).

=== McDonough and Gruden ===
Tirico's role as play-by-play voice was replaced by Sean McDonough, who prior to the promotion had been one of the voices of ESPN's college football broadcasts. However, McDonough only lasted two seasons and did not return after the 2017 season. In addition, Gruden was rehired to coach the Raiders, opening the door for a new MNF broadcast team.

=== Tessitore, McFarland and Witten ===
In the 2018 season, Joe Tessitore became the new voice of Monday Night Football. Tessitore was initially joined by then-retired NFL tight end Jason Witten on the booth, and on the field by Booger McFarland. McFarland, who has been a college football analyst for the network since 2014, served as field analyst and consultant. In addition, rules analyst Gerald Austin left MNF to work as an adviser to Gruden and the Raiders and was replaced by recently retired referee Jeff Triplette.

That season, the Kansas City Chiefs-Los Angeles Rams game on November 19 set the record for the highest scoring game in MNF's history. The game was originally scheduled to be played at Estadio Azteca in Mexico City, but was moved to the Los Angeles Memorial Coliseum (the Rams' home stadium at the time, which itself last hosted a Monday Night Football game in 1985) due to the poor field conditions at the former. The Rams defeated the Chiefs by a score of 54–51.

Awful Announcing's Ben Koo wrote on October 23, 2018, that Jason Witten was in over his head as an analyst. Koo added that Witten made mistakes, was inconsistent, got tongue tied, and was awkward at times. Meanwhile, the gimmick of placing Booger McFarland in on-field mobile platform was clunky because all involved had to have direct comments and questions to each other explicitly, and there were lulls in the broadcast at times when it's not clear which of McFarland or Witten should be jumping in. As for play-by-play man Joe Tessitore, Koo regarded him as an acquired taste and many were not acquiring it. This was due to Tessitore's style of going HARD on a lot of calls, in energy and volume. Besides the commentators, Ben Koo complained about the distracting sponsorships from Old Spice and Genesis Motor.

On November 29, 2018, Deadspin's Drew Magary said that ESPN "Is too busy living in Monday Night Football's glorious past, trying to turn the franchise into an event with needless innovations and halftime concerts -- like The Chainsmokers during last week's Rams-Chiefs game. All of those efforts to recapture MNF's magic failed, but that hasn't stopped ESPN from continuously trying to doctor up ways to make the game as much of an EVENT as it was back in the 1970s. This is a show imprisoned by its own history. They still have pictures of Howard Cosell adorning the MNF production trucks. They still use the theme. They dragged Hank Williams Jr. out of racist mothballs to sing his stupid f*cking song from the '80s salad days. They still use ancient clips of Cosell slurring "He could go all the way" and 'What a game this turned out to be' and all that nonsense. They refer to Monday records as if they are hallowed... None of that has stopped ESPN from still trying desperately to make Monday Night Football a thing. In the process, they've in fact cheapened the product."

=== Tessitore and McFarland ===
ESPN underwent another broadcast booth shakeup, as Jason Witten left to return to the Dallas Cowboys, and rules analyst Jeff Triplette left after one season. Triplette was replaced with John Parry, who retired after Super Bowl LIII. Witten was not replaced, therefore making the 2019 broadcast team consist of Joe Tessitore (play-by-play), Booger McFarland (color commentator) and Lisa Salters (sideline reporter).

Early on in the 2019 season, there were so many Twitter complaints over ESPN's then new down and distance marker that it was dropped after halftime. To clarify, ESPN made the down-and-distance graphic yellow, so it looked like there was a flag on every play. ESPN's Bill Hofheimer tweeted "Our ESPN production team is aware of the feedback on the #MNF down and distance graphic. We have called an audible and adjusted for the 2nd half of #HOUvsNO and for the #DENvsOAK game to follow."

When reviewing ESPN's production of the New England Patriots-New York Jets game from Week 7 of the 2019 season, The A.V. Club's John Teti wrote that "Once, Monday Night was the climax of an NFL week. Now it often feels like a last gasp. Monday Night isn't special anymore, but the production never formed a new identity to contend with that reality. So there's a lot of pretending. We all must pretend it matters when, say, a running back gains more yards in the third quarter of a Monday Night Football game than anyone has before. It's not clear why the Monday Night-ness of an achievement matters to anyone in 2019—though, did it ever? Regardless, part of the lore of Monday Night Football is that the lore of Monday Night Football is very important indeed."

Oliver Connolly in the November 26, 2019 edition of The Guardian boldly wrote that Monday Night Football: the once great NFL show was now the worst on television. The article cited the overblown announcing by Joe Tessitore, incoherent analysis by Booger McFarland and bizarre graphics. Connolly further wrote that "It often feels like the show's producers are more interested in their carefully choreographed packages and graphics than the actual game unfolding on the field. No other broadcast misses a play as consistently as Monday Night Football, continuing to prove that there is nothing in media or entertainment that cannot be ruined by more money and time."

Neither Tessitore nor McFarland were retained after the 2019 season due to a bevy of criticism surrounding their work. However, ESPN decided to have the latter swap places with Louis Riddick on Monday Night Countdown.

=== Levy, Griese and Riddick ===
The 2020 season saw another major revamp to ESPN's booth, with Steve Levy, Brian Griese, and Louis Riddick, joining lone holdover Lisa Salters. ESPN's lead college football commentary team of Chris Fowler, Kirk Herbstreit, and Maria Taylor called the first game of the Week 1 doubleheader (as Fowler and Taylor were already in the New York area handling the US Open for ESPN and the NBA Finals for ABC respectively). To formally celebrate the 50th anniversary of Monday Night Football, the Las Vegas Raiders' Week 2 home opener (their first after relocating from Oakland) was simulcast by ABC, the first regular season game the network's aired in any form since 2005, and given the Megacast treatment with a “watch party” broadcast on ESPN2, which aired its first-ever NFL game in its entirety. The Hank Williams Jr. MNF theme was once again dropped, being replaced by a cover of Little Richard's "Rip It Up" by Virginia-based band Butcher Brown.

Initially, ESPN had an opportunity to air a second MNF doubleheader when the Broncos–Patriots game, originally scheduled on October 4, was postponed to October 12 due to a player testing positive for COVID-19, The game would have been scheduled for a 5:00 p.m. ET kickoff with Fowler and Herbstreit working the game. However, additional positive tests from New England forced the NFL to reschedule the game to October 18, along with a slew of other rescheduled games involving the Dolphins, Jets, Chargers and Jaguars.

Later on in the season, ABC simulcast two more MNF games (both involving the Buffalo Bills), and the Wild Card game ESPN usually gets, received the Megacast treatment on ESPN2, ESPN+, and Freeform, airing their first live sports event since the 2002 MLB postseason, when Freeform was known as ABC Family.

On March 18, 2021, the NFL announced that ESPN had renewed its rights to Monday Night Football. Under the new deal, both ESPN and ABC will gain a simulcast Saturday doubleheader on the final weekend of the season beginning in 2021. And beginning in 2023, it will gain four additional regular season games (with three airing on ABC as Monday doubleheaders, and one Sunday morning NFL International Series game exclusive to ESPN+), flex scheduling beginning in Week 12, the ability to feature up to four teams twice per-season, as well as produce many alternate broadcast feeds of select games, under their Megacast series. All MNF games will stream on ESPN+, and ESPN/ABC will also gain rights to a divisional playoff game, and two future Super Bowls for ABC.

==== The "ManningCast" ====
ESPN took advantage of the new Megacast part of their new contract by announcing on July 19, 2021, that Peyton and Eli Manning would host an alternate presentation of Monday Night Football for ESPN2 and ESPN+. Under a new deal signed by ESPN and Omaha Productions for three seasons, ten games will receive this alternate broadcast each year.

The first Manningcast aired on ESPN2, on September 13, 2021, as one of three feeds produced of the first Monday Night Football game of the 2021 season, between the Las Vegas Raiders and Baltimore Ravens. The main broadcast was also simulcast on ABC, and the Manningcast was also simulcast on ESPN+, who also aired another alternate feed.

On November 13, 2021, ESPN announced that the Manningcast would be a part of ESPN's coverage of the new Monday night NFL Wild Card Game, which also included ABC and ESPN+.

After a very successful first season, ESPN and Omaha Productions agreed to a one-year extension of the Manningcast, while also expanding Omaha Productions’ Megacast production rights to other sports like: college football, UFC events, and select golf tournaments.

A "curse" akin to the Madden curse began to develop upon players who made guest appearances on the broadcasts, with an observed pattern of players having a decline in performance the following week.

=== Buck and Aikman ===
Following the 2021 season, reports came out that Hall of Fame quarterback Troy Aikman would be leaving Fox Sports to join ESPN. His longtime partner Joe Buck would eventually join him. These changes resulted in Griese leaving to become the quarterbacks coach with the San Francisco 49ers. Meanwhile, Levy, Riddick and Dan Orlovsky will serve as the secondary team during doubleheader weeks, and Laura Rutledge would serve as that team's sideline reporter.

On January 2, 2023, during the ongoing Week 17 game of the 2022 NFL season between the Buffalo Bills and Cincinnati Bengals, Bills safety Damar Hamlin collapsed with 5:58 left in the first quarter after tackling wide receiver Tee Higgins. Hamlin went into cardiac arrest near midfield at Paycor Stadium. CPR and defibrillation were administered before he was rushed to a local hospital. The game was aired on ABC, ESPN, ESPN2, ESPN+ and ESPN Deportes as part of ESPN's Monday Night Football coverage. Because of an overrun from the 2023 Rose Bowl airing immediately prior to the game on ESPN (and diversion of Megacast resources to that game), there was no Manningcast for this game on ESPN2. Buck and Aikman were on the call for the initial incident, but coverage was quickly moved to ESPN's Monday Night Countdown studio team of Adam Schefter, Booger McFarland and Suzy Kolber. Following the announcement of the game's suspension, coverage shifted to SportsCenter with Scott Van Pelt live from Washington, D.C.

ESPN was praised for its coverage of the incident. Contributors Ryan Clark and Booger McFarland were specifically praised for their commentary. ESPN's coverage of the incident, on ABC, ESPN, ESPN2 and ESPN Deportes, from 9 p.m. to 10:15 pm, which mostly featured coverage from the Monday Night Countdown crew, averaged 23.9 million viewers. SportsCenter's coverage, from 10:15 p.m. to 11 p.m., on ESPN and ABC, averaged 14.3 million viewers. The NFL was criticized for its reaction to the incident. Joe Buck initially reported on the broadcast that after the ambulance took Hamlin away, the NFL had told teams they had five minutes to prepare to resume playing. This decision was criticized immediately by commentators, but the NFL denied the report. The following day, Buck responded to the NFL and Vincent, and stood by the claim that he was told both teams had five minutes to warm-up before resuming the game. A similar report regarding the players warming-up to resume play was aired on Westwood One.

Prior to the 2023 season, ESPN reportedly replaced Steve Levy with Chris Fowler on the second team with Louis Riddick, Dan Orlovsky and Laura Rutledge. The 2023 season was also the first year in which more viable games are allowed to be flexed to Monday Night Football between weeks 12 and 17. The first such flex scheduling took place on November 30, 2023, when the Week 15 matchup between the Kansas City Chiefs and the New England Patriots was removed from Monday Night Football in favor of the Philadelphia Eagles at the Seattle Seahawks.

The relationship between Buck and Aikman reportedly soured during the 2026 season after Buck signed an extension to remain in the booth through Super Bowl LXIV while the network did not commit to retaining Aikman, leading to a confrontation between the two prior to the Buffalo Bills-Los Angeles Rams contest at SoFi Stadium. While NFL executive leadership has downplayed any rift between the two, Aikman has hinted he would likely be a free agent after ABC/ESPN airs Super Bowl LXI.
