= Jen Leigh =

American journalist

Jennifer "Jen" Leigh is a news anchor for WFLA-TV in Tampa, Florida where she anchors weeknights at 5, 5:30, 7 & 11pm. She has been with WFLA-TV since 1993.

== Early life and college ==
Leigh was born in Miami, Florida but grew up in Lakeland, Florida. She is the oldest of seven children. She graduated Cum Laude from the University of South Florida with a bachelor’s degree in Mass Communications in 1994.

== Career ==
Leigh joined WFLA-TV as an intern and later was hired as an assignment editor at while still a USF student in 1993. Two years later, she launched News Channel 8’s Polk County bureau and became a full-time reporter there. She served as a weekend anchor, morning fill-in anchor and evening fill-in anchor. She became the 7 p.m. anchor in 2012. She replaced Gayle Sierens first at the 11 PM News in 2014 and then at 5 PM when Sierens retired the following year.
