= Monday Night Mayhem =

2002 TV film directed by Ernest Dickerson

- DVD cover
- Based on: Monday Night Mayhem by: Marc Gunther; Bill Carter
- Teleplay by: Bill Carter
- Directed by: Ernest Dickerson
- Starring: John Turturro; John Heard; Kevin Anderson; Nicholas Turturro; Brad Beyer; Patti Lupone; Eli Wallach
- Music by: Van Dyke Parks
- Country of origin: United States
- Original language: English

Production
- Executive producer: Leslie Greif
- Cinematography: Jonathan Freeman
- Editor: Stephen Lovejoy
- Running time: 98 minutes
- Production company: Greif Company

Original release
- Network: TNT
- Release: January 14, 2002

Monday Night Mayhem is a 2002 television film about the origin of ABC's television series Monday Night Football. It debuted on the American cable TV network TNT on January 14, 2002. It was based on the 1988 nonfiction book of the same title by Marc Gunther and Bill Carter.

== Cast ==
- John Turturro as Howard Cosell
- John Heard as Roone Arledge
- Kevin Anderson as Frank Gifford
- Nicholas Turturro as Chet Forte
- Brad Beyer as Don Meredith
- Patti LuPone as Emmy Cosell
- Eli Wallach as Leonard Goldenson
- Shuler Hensley as Keith Jackson
- Jay Thomas as Pete Rozelle
- Brennan Brown as Bob Goodrich
- Chad L. Coleman as O. J. Simpson

== Production ==
Filming took place in New York, New Jersey, and other locations by Turner Network Television.

== Reception ==
Phil Gallo of Variety complained that "nobody looks quite right" and "there is invariably a thin line between caricature and character."

Larry Stewart of the Los Angeles Times gave the film a negative review, writing, "The book was good, the movie isn’t. It appears to be cheaply made and the characters, particularly Frank Gifford and Don Meredith, are not believable. John Turturro does a decent job portraying Cosell, but his performance isn’t enough to save the movie." Stewart concludes, "It doesn’t come close to matching a documentary HBO did a couple of years ago titled “Cosell.”"

Allen Barra of The New York Times gave the film a more positive review, writing that the film "works because of Mr. Turturro's unabashed joy in playing a part as juicy as Howard Cosell."

== Home media ==
The movie was released on VHS and DVD on September 10, 2002.

== See also ==
- List of American football films
