= Maggie Rodriguez =

American television reporter and anchor

- Born: Margarita Dania Rodriguez; December 12, 1969 (age 56); Miami, Florida, U.S.
- Education: American University; University of Miami
- Occupation: Journalist
- Years active: 1989–present
- Notable credit(s): WLTV-DT; KABC-TV; WFOR-TV; CBS News; WFLA-TV

Margarita Dania Rodriguez (born December 12, 1969) is a former co-anchor of the CBS television broadcast, The Early Show, from December 2007 to December 2010. Rodriguez was also a substitute anchor for Katie Couric on The CBS Evening News. Rodriguez was formerly co-anchor of the Saturday edition of The Early Show in 2007.

Rodriguez was born in Miami and grew up in South Florida. She graduated from Our Lady of Lourdes Academy in 1987. She attended American University in Washington, D.C., and graduated from the University of Miami in 1991 with a degree in broadcast journalism and Spanish. Rodriguez and her husband have two children: Michael Tobin was born June 13, 2010 and Daniella was born in 2005.

== Career ==
Rodriguez began her career in journalism began at WLTV-DT (1989–90), a Univision owned-and-operated station in Miami, where she was an associate producer, field producer and assignment editor. From 1991 to 1994, she also served as a reporter for the WLTV-DT. Then in 1994, Rodriguez joined KABC-TV in Los Angeles, California. She was a field reporter and covered a wide array of stories, including earthquakes, mudslides and the O.J. Simpson murder trial. In addition, she was anchor of the midday edition of Eyewitness News and of KABC's weekend news magazine show Eye on LA.

Rodriguez returned to Miami in 2000, where she anchored the 5:00 p.m. and 11:00 p.m. newscasts at WFOR-TV, the CBS owned-and-operated station in Miami. While there, she reported on and anchored coverage of a wide range of major news events, including many hurricanes and, from New York City, the one-year anniversary of the September 11 attacks. Rodriguez was first on the air with coverage of the transfer of power in Cuba from Fidel Castro to his brother, Raúl. The newscast received an RTNDA Edward R. Murrow Award for its coverage of that story. Rodriguez has received a total of seven Emmy Awards and two RTNDA Edward R. Murrow Awards.

Rodriguez is mostly known for her role as a news anchor on CBS's The Early Show from 2008 to 2010. She worked alongside anchors Julie Chen Moonves, Harry Smith, and Dave Price until 2010, when CBS announced Rodriguez, Smith, and Price would all be replaced. All three anchors were replaced by Erica Hill and Chris Wragge starting January 3, 2011. Since her replacement, Rodriguez has moved back to Miami.

Rodriguez's alma mater, the University of Miami, awarded her the first-ever "Alpha Epsilon Rho Professional of the Year Award", its top honor for professionals in the communication industry. She also is the recipient of the Hispanic Heritage Council's "Young Hispanic Leadership Award" for professional accomplishments and community service.

In February 2021, Rodriguez returned to television as co-host of Daytime, a lifestyle and entertainment program which airs on Tampa NBC affiliate WFLA-TV (owned by Nexstar Media Group).
