= Keith Cate =

American journalist

Keith Alvin Cate has been a main anchor for WFLA-TV (Channel 8) in Tampa, Florida from 2000 to 2026.

Cate has won 12 Emmy Awards from the National Academy of Television Arts and Sciences along with four Edward R. Murrow awards and other journalism-related recognitions. Cate is one of the main reporters for both WFLA and the Associated Press on crime in the Tampa Bay area. He graduated from East Tennessee State University with a bachelor's degree in broadcast communication in 1984. He served as a weekend anchor and reporter at CBS affiliate WBNS-TV from 1988 to 1993 and also worked at WMAR-TV. He worked as a news anchor and reporter at WIAT CBS 42, in Birmingham, Alabama before working in Tampa.
