= WFLA-TV =

Television station in Tampa, Florida

- Tampa–St. Petersburg, Florida; United States
- City: Tampa, Florida
- Channels: Digital: 9 (VHF), shared with WTTA; Virtual: 8
- Branding: NewsChannel 8

Programming
- Affiliations: 8.1: NBC; 8.2: Charge!; 8.3: Antenna TV

Ownership
- Owner: Nexstar Media Group; (Nexstar Media Inc.)
- Sister stations: WTTA, WSNN-LD; Tegna: WTSP

History
- First air date: February 14, 1955
- Former call signs: WXFL (1983–1988)
- Former channel numbers: Analog: 8 (VHF, 1955–2009); Digital: 7 (VHF, 1999–2020)
- Call sign meaning: Florida (carryover from former sister radio station WFLA)

Technical information
- Licensing authority: FCC
- Facility ID: 64592
- ERP: 41 kW
- HAAT: 465.3 m (1,527 ft)
- Transmitter coordinates: 27°50′33″N 82°15′44″W

Links
- Public license information: Public file; LMS
- Website: www.wfla.com

WFLA-TV (channel 8) is a television station licensed to Tampa, Florida, United States, serving as the NBC affiliate for the Tampa Bay area. It is owned by Nexstar Media Group alongside CW station WTTA (channel 38) and WSNN-LD (channel 39); Nexstar's Tegna subsidiary owns WTSP (channel 10). WFLA-TV and WTTA share studios on South Parker Street in downtown Tampa; through a channel sharing agreement, the two stations transmit using WFLA-TV's spectrum from a transmitter in Riverview, Florida.

== History ==
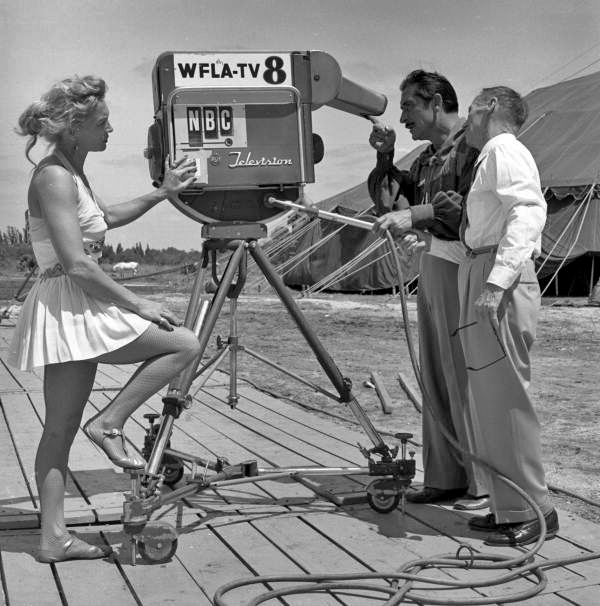
Circus performers looking at the new Kaleidoscope camera used by WFLA-TV to film a documentary about the Cristiani family.

Channel 8 first signed on the air on February 14, 1955, with a live broadcast of the Gasparilla Pirate Festival. It is the longest serving television outlet in the Tampa Bay region still in operation, as it signed on less than two years behind UHF outlet WSUN-TV (channel 38), which ceased operations in 1970. WFLA-TV was originally owned by The Tampa Tribune, along with WFLA (970 AM) and WFLA-FM 93.3. WFLA-TV has been an NBC affiliate since the station's inception. Largely because of its newspaper background, it was the early ratings leader in the Tampa market until WTVT (channel 13) passed it for first place in 1962. In 1966, Richmond Newspapers, publishers of the Richmond Times-Dispatch and part-owner of the Tribune, acquired full control of the paper and the WFLA radio and television stations. Three years later, Richmond Newspapers changed its name to Media General, and WFLA-TV, the first television station owned and operated by the company, would be the flagship of its broadcasting group for the rest of its existence.

Due to a Federal Communications Commission (FCC) regulation in effect at the time that stated that TV and radio stations in the same market, but with different owners had to have differing call signs, the station's call sign was changed to WXFL on January 19, 1983, after the WFLA radio stations were sold. At the time, FCC cross-ownership regulations forced Media General to sell the radio stations; however, the company was granted a permanent waiver permitting it to keep The Tampa Tribune and the television station. Channel 8 reverted to its original WFLA-TV call letters on January 1, 1989. That same year, it surged to first place in the Tampa Bay ratings and has stayed there for most of that time, led by one of the most popular anchor teams in the country. For one day in May 1999, UPN affiliate WTOG (channel 44) housed the operations for WFLA-TV, after a power outage occurred at the station's main studios in Downtown Tampa.

WFLA-TV and The Tampa Tribune remained corporate siblings until Media General sold the newspaper to Tampa Media Group Inc. in October 2012 as part of Media General's selloff of its newspaper holdings in a reorganization to alleviate the company's substantial debt load. (With the exception of the Tribune, the company's other newspapers went to World Media Enterprises). Despite the split, the two outlets continued a newsgathering partnership until the Tribune was merged with the Tampa Bay Times in 2016, with their operations adjacent to one another at the downtown Tampa facility. In January 2013, as a result of the sale, WFLA-TV began outsourcing its digital operations and website to Worldnow, as part of a group deal with the company. Following the takeover of the company by the principal staff of LIN Media, Media General's stations, including WFLA, have since migrated to the WordPress.com-based platform and site design previously introduced by LIN, which in turn is now being replaced by Nexstar's own Lakana CMS platform.

On August 20, 2014, Media General announced that it would acquire MyNetworkTV affiliate WTTA (channel 38) from Sinclair Broadcast Group. The deal made WTTA a sister station to WFLA-TV.

On January 27, 2016, it was announced that the Nexstar Broadcasting Group would buy Media General for $4.6 billion. WFLA and WTTA became part of the newly minted Nexstar Media Group on January 17, 2017.

On August 19, 2025, Nexstar announced it would acquire Tegna Inc.—owner of CBS affiliate WTSP (channel 10)—for $6.2 billion. The deal was completed on March 19, 2026, and included approval for Nexstar to own three station licenses in markets such as Tampa Bay. A temporary restraining order issued one week later by the U.S. District Court for the Eastern District of California, later escalated to a preliminary injunction, has prevented Nexstar from integrating the stations.

== Programming ==
WFLA-TV mostly clears the entire NBC programming lineup, but it airs the fourth hour of Today at noon instead of the network's recommended 10 a.m. time slot which is occupied by the local lifestyle program, Daytime (see below).

=== Daytime ===
WFLA-TV produces Daytime, a lifestyle and entertainment program which airs weekday mornings at 10 am; the program features regular correspondents and contributors for various topics. In 2003, WFLA and Daytime caused controversy after The New York Times reported of its "pay for play" practices. The article revealed that businesses were charged several thousand dollars to appear on the show, effectively making their segments "paid segments". Many people saw this as payola, a practice that is illegal under an FCC ruling. After much dispute, WFLA agreed to identify each paid segment as such to avoid an intervention from Congress.

Original hosts Debra Schrills and Brian Fasulo left the show in 2005. They were later replaced by Cyndi Edwards and Danny New. From 2008 to September 2011, the show aired nationally on the Retro Television Network as part of Media General's affiliation deal with the network, but was dropped by RTV when Media General switched most of its stations' subchannel affiliations to MeTV. National broadcasts of the show currently air on The Family Channel and Youtoo America. Edwards left Daytime in September 2020 and was replaced by former CBS News correspondent Maggie Rodriguez in February 2021.

=== Sports programming ===
Since 2006, channel 8 airs any Tampa Bay Buccaneers games when they are featured on NBC Sunday Night Football; the station also served as the default home station of the team in its first season as a member of the American Football Conference in 1976; with the team's move to the National Football Conference the next year, the station aired up to two games a season in which they played host to an AFC team at Tampa Stadium until the end of the 1997 season. WFLA provided local coverage of Super Bowl XLIII, which was hosted at Raymond James Stadium. In addition, through NBC's broadcast contract with the NHL that ran through 2021, Tampa Bay Lightning games aired on the station; this included their Stanley Cup Final appearance in 2015 and their victories in 2020 and 2021 (game five of the latter series was the last NHL game aired on NBC).

=== News operation ===
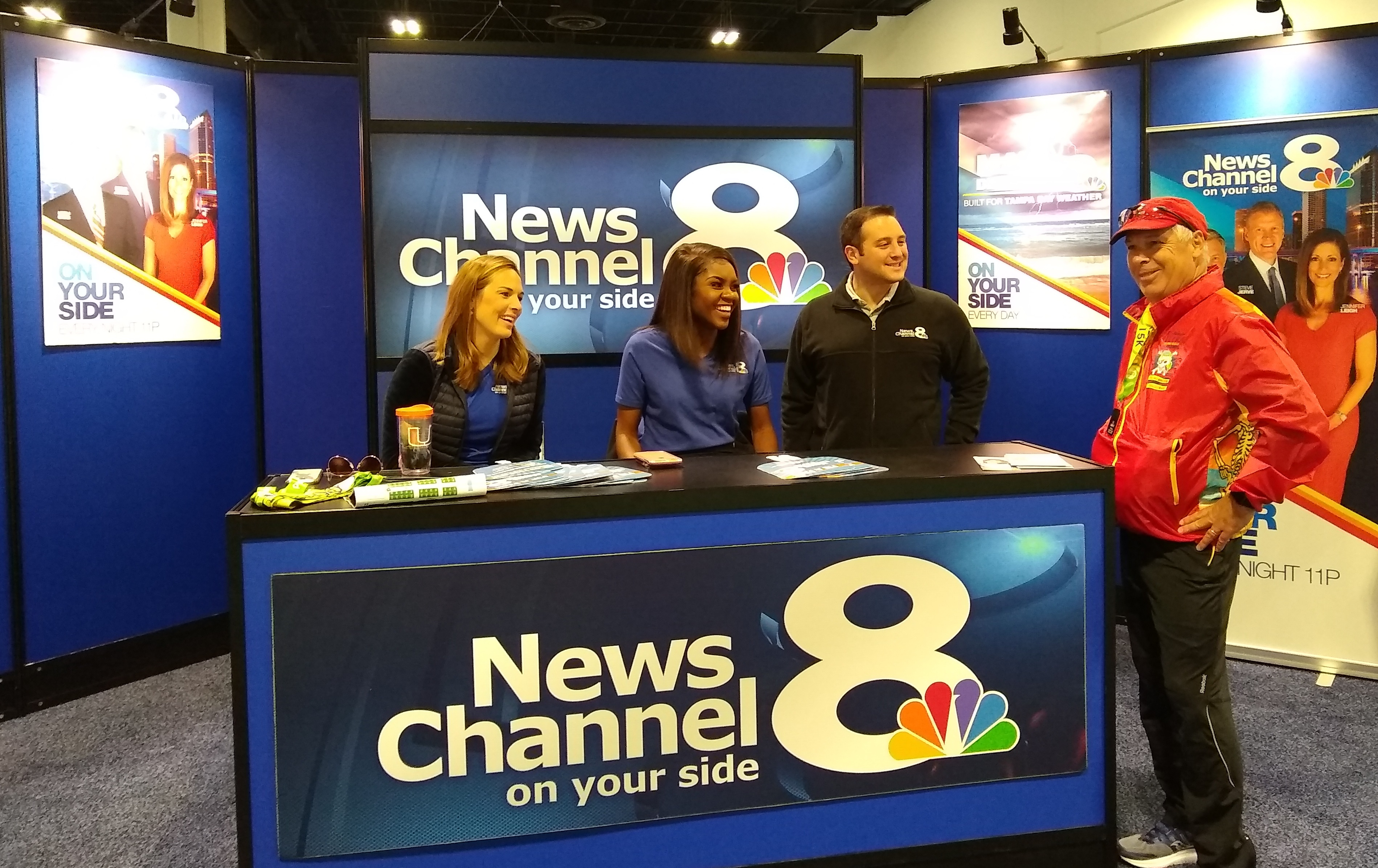
The WFLA News Channel 8 booth at the Gasparilla Distance Classic Expo in 2020.

WFLA presently broadcasts 42 hours of locally produced newscasts each week (with seven hours each weekday, three hours on Saturdays and four hours on Sundays). Arch Deal and Bill Henry were the prominent faces of WFLA's newscasts in the 1960s. Deal's tenure was abruptly cut short in 1975, when he suffered injuries from a parachute accident. Bob Koop served as the evening anchor from 1977 to 1979. Longtime anchorman Bob Hite came to the anchor desk in 1979. The station began using a helicopter for newsgathering called "Eagle 8" in October 1985.

Bill Ratliff, who was brought in to anchor the evening newscasts in 1982 and had been morning and noon anchor since 1985, retired from WFLA on June 25, 2009; Ratliff (who was previously a political contributor at WTSP) died on May 8, 2012. WFLA began broadcasting its local newscasts in high definition in early September 2007. Following Bob Hite's November 2007 retirement after 30 years, Keith Cate assumed anchor duties of the 6 and 11 p.m. newscasts along with veteran anchor Gayle Sierens, who herself retired in May 2015.

In the midst of a market shake-up in December 1994, which saw three Tampa area stations swapping network affiliations (CBS affiliate WTVT switching to Fox; ABC affiliate WTSP switching to CBS; and Fox affiliate WFTS-TV, channel 28, switching to ABC), WFLA was one of the few major stations in the market that did not change its network affiliation. As a result, it became the highest-rated station in the market, a position formerly held by WTVT, which saw its ratings drop after switching from CBS to Fox. However, since NBC's ill-fated prime time experiment with The Jay Leno Show from September 2009 to January 2010, WTVT regained the top spot.

In the February 2012 sweeps period, WFLA was the clear ratings winner for early morning, evening, and late news. It was also the only station in the market to gain an audience for its late newscast despite NBC's lackluster ratings performance at the time. On July 30, 2012, WFLA debuted a new weeknight 7 p.m. newscast; the first such program in that timeslot in the Tampa market since WFLA produced a similar newscast for WXPX-TV (channel 66) from 2000 to 2002. On August 26, 2013, WFLA launched an hour-long 4 p.m. newscast. Concurrent with the addition, WFLA dropped its 11:30 a.m. newscast on August 23 (the second time WFLA discontinued its midday newscast in its history, although it retains a noon newscast on Saturdays and Sundays), however, management stated that a midday newscast may return to the station's weekday schedule in September 2014. However, it was less than 3 years later in May 2016, when WFLA reintroduced a new one-hour midday newscast at 11 a.m.

At the start of 2015, WFLA assumed production of WTTA's news updates, Great 38 News Now. Previously, the news updates, which debuted eleven days before Media General's acquisition of WTTA, were produced by that station's former sister in West Palm Beach, WPEC. On January 4, 2016, WFLA once again began producing a local newscast for WTTA, this time, a nightly hour-long newscast at 8 p.m. under the title NewsChannel 8 at 8:00 on Great 38, pushing WTTA's MyNetworkTV programming back one hour. On August 7, 2017, WFLA began producing another local newscast for WTTA, this time, a two-hour expansion of its morning newscast under the title NewsChannel 8 Today on Great 38, airing from 7 a.m. to 9 am. Until September 28, 2018, the second hour of that program, which was titled, Make Today Gr8 with Gayle and Leigh, was co-hosted by Gayle Guyardo and morning meteorologist Leigh Spann.

On August 4, 2021, Tampa Mayor Jane Castor declared "Steve Jerve Day", in honor of WFLA's longtime meteorologist, who would retire two days later after 23 years at the station.

==== Notable current on-air staff ====
- Jen Leigh – anchor
- Maggie Rodriguez – co-host of Daytime

==== Notable former on-air staff ====
- Keith Cate – anchor (2000–2026)
- Dick Crippen – sports director (1981–1999)
- Arch Deal – anchor (1950s–1975)
- Rich Fields – meteorology intern (2000–2002)
- Chris Hansen – reporter (1981–1983)
- Jack Harris – host (NewsWatch 8 at Noon, 1990–1992; Harris & Company/Harris Live, 1992–2000)
- John Muller – reporter (1989–2001)
- Byron Pitts – reporter (1988–1990)
- Victoria Price – anchor/reporter (2018–2020)
- Annie Sabo – sports reporter (2017–2019)
- Gayle Sierens – anchor (1977–2015)
- Tony Zappone – news correspondent (1965–1977)

=== Controversy and criticism ===
==== Silencing Christians ====
On June 27, 2009, WFLA aired an hour-long documentary, Silencing Christians, which dealt with the Fundamentalist Christian position of condemning homosexuality as a sin, and claims of the gay community's drive to make all criticism of homosexuality as hate speech in the name of political correctness. The documentary, presented as a paid program from the American Family Association, was televised at 7 p.m. that evening, on the same day that St. Petersburg held the city's pride parade, St. Pete Pride, on the weekend of the 40th anniversary of the Stonewall riots.

Prior to the telecast, the station was swamped with phone calls and e-mails against WFLA's broadcast of the program. After it aired, the station logged hundreds of phone calls and over 1,000 e-mails protesting the broadcast.

General manager Mike Pumo refused to elaborate on the decision, other than the show's content did not "raise the red flag" during pre-screening. Stratton Pollitzer, deputy director of Equality Florida, considered the show hate speech, saying, "I think this program is a piece of homophobic propaganda and it has no place on a major network like NBC" despite the fact that NBC is merely the network that WFLA is affiliated with.

On July 15, 2009, 70 to 100 protesters gathered outside of WFLA's studios to protest against the special and the station's attitude towards the community. The station, however, remained firm on its decision to show the program.

== Technical information ==
=== Subchannels ===
WFLA-TV and WTTA transmit using WFLA-TV's spectrum from a transmitter site in Riverview, Florida. The stations' signals are multiplexed:

Subchannels of WFLA-TV and WTTA
License	Subchannel	Res.	Short name	Programming
WFLA-TV	8.1	1080i	WFLA HD	NBC
WFLA-TV	8.2	480i	Charge!	Charge!
WFLA-TV	8.3	480i	Antenna	Antenna TV
WTTA	38.1	720p	WTTA	The CW
WTTA	38.2	480i	COZI	Cozi TV

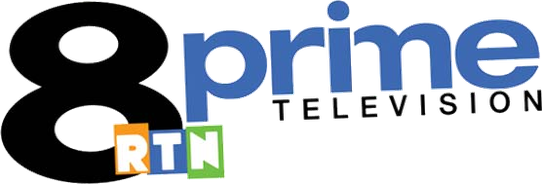
Former 8 Prime logo, under the RTV affiliation

WFLA-TV carried NBC Weather Plus on digital subchannel 8.2 until 2008. The station replaced the Retro Television Network with MeTV on digital subchannel 8.2 on September 26, 2011, as part of a groupwide affiliation agreement with Media General; the Weigel Broadcasting-owned MeTV network also replaced RTV on some Media General-owned stations in other markets. On September 26, 2019, Court TV replaced MeTV as the primary subchannel affiliate of WFLA-TV, with MeTV moving to WMOR-TV. Nexstar announced in early June 2021 that WFLA-DT2 would take the company's Antenna TV network on September 1, 2021, after a three-month interregnum when WTSP replaced it with their own in-house network, Twist.

=== Analog-to-digital conversion ===
WFLA-TV shut down its analog signal, over VHF channel 8, on June 12, 2009, as part of the federally mandated transition from analog to digital television. The station's digital signal remained on its pre-transition VHF channel 7, using virtual channel 8.
