= Jerry Kapstein =

American attorney and sports agent

Jeremy A. Kapstein is an American attorney and sports agent. He represented most of the highly-paid players in Major League Baseball (MLB) in the decade following the advent of free agency in the mid-1970s. He was called "the Scott Boras of his day" by Dan Shaughnessy in Francona: The Red Sox Years, a book he co-wrote with Terry Francona.

== Politics ==
Kapstein began his run for Rhode Island lieutenant governor on April 29, 2010. He was the first politician to speak out against the state government granting Curt Schilling and his 38 Studios a $75-million loan guarantee to move the company to Providence. He received 35.8% of the votes in his Democratic primary loss to the incumbent Elizabeth H. Roberts on September 14. An injury sustained in a car accident in Boston thwarted his second attempt at running for the same office four years later.

== Notable clients ==
- Doyle Alexander
- Dusty Baker
- Don Baylor
- Greg Booker
- Al Bumbry
- Rick Burleson
- Bert Campaneris
- Clay Carroll
- Dave Cash
- Dave Concepción
- Mike Cuellar
- John Curtis
- John D'Acquisto
- Rawly Eastwick
- Darrell Evans
- Rollie Fingers
- Carlton Fisk
- Mike Flanagan
- Wayne Garland
- Steve Garvey
- Goose Gossage
- Bobby Grich
- Ross Grimsley
- Don Gullett
- Andy Hawkins
- Ken Holtzman
- Randy Jones
- Darold Knowles
- Fred Lynn
- Garry Maddox
- Lance McCullers
- Graig Nettles
- Gary Nolan
- Tony Pérez
- Jerry Remy
- Dave Roberts
- Joe Rudi
- Gene Tenace

== Personal life ==
Kapstein married Linda Smith, the daughter of San Diego Padres owner Joan Kroc and ex-wife of former club president Ballard Smith, at La Jolla Beach and Tennis Club on October 12, 1988. In 1990, Linda Smith filed for a divorce from Kapstein after 18 months of marriage.
