= Victoria Price (journalist) =

American journalist

- Born: San Diego, California
- Education: Boston University
- Occupations: anchor, reporter
- Employer: WHDH (TV)

Victoria Price is a reporter for WHDH (TV).

== Early life and college ==
A native of San Diego, California, Price graduated from Boston University in 2013 with a degree in broadcast journalism and international relations. Just prior to graduation, The Boston Marathon bombing happened and she rushed to the scene and jumped over the barricades using her phone to interview people. Thanks to a fellow BU alum, she did a live shot for a station KAMC in Lubbock, Texas who ended up hiring her for her first Television job.

== Career ==
After being with KAMC for two years, Price joined KARK-TV in Little Rock, Arkansas in 2015. She worked as a morning anchor and reporter for two years before becoming KARK's weekend anchor in 2017. In 2018, Price left KARK to join WFLA-TV in Tampa, Florida. She was a reporter and fill-in anchor for the 8 PM News Program at the sister station WTTA before becoming an investigated reporter. She left WFLA in December 2020 to take some time off before coming back not only to cover the news but also to her college city in Boston by joining WHDH (TV) in September 2021.

== Personal life ==
She is a retired competitive equestrian, she still gets in the saddle from time to time and is an avid snowboarder. During her time at WFLA-TV, she got an email from a viewer saying "Hi, just saw your news report. What concerned me is the lump on your neck. Please have your thyroid checked. Reminds me of my neck. Mine turned out to be cancer. Take care of yourself.". At first, Price decided to ignore it until her boyfriend a fellow journalist encouraged her to check it out. She went to the doctor's office and turned out, she did have cancer on her thyroid. Price ended up having surgery and missed a week or so of work before returning.
