= Bob Goodrich =

American football player and sports TV producer

Robert Goodrich is a former high school All-American football player and television ABC Sports producer.

== Education ==
Goodrich attended Woodrow Wilson High School in Dallas, Texas, lettering in football, track, and basketball. A two-time All-American, he was inducted into the Dallas Independent School District Athletics Hall of Fame in 2020. He played college football at Southern Methodist University in Dallas, Texas, although he received scholarship offers from over 50 schools across the nation. Goodrich received his bachelor's degree in psychology and played tight end on the SMU team that won the 1966 Southwest Conference Championship and played in the 1967 Cotton Bowl Classic.

== Career ==
=== ABC Sports ===
Goodrich started his career in 1970 at ABC Sports. He began working for ABC on a part-time basis, performing various duties on different sports telecasts. In addition to the hands-on experience he gained, Goodrich learned about the business from the sports broadcasting pioneer Roone Arledge. Goodrich joined ABC Sports full-time in 1971 as a production assistant, becoming an associate producer in 1973 before being elevated to full producer in 1976.

Goodrich was producer of ABC’s NFL’s Monday Night Football from 1980–86. He was appointed producer by Arledge after sportscaster Howard Cosell and MNF director Chet Forte revolted against new producer Terry O'Neil on the eve of the 1980 regular season. Goodrich "was not considered creative," rather "he had an amiable personality and a subdued ego," which was what Arledge decided the broadcasts needed in the midst of turmoil. In the made-for-TV dramatization of Monday Night Mayhem, a book by authors Bill Carter and Marc Gunther, actor Brennan Brown portrayed Goodrich, who worked as a consultant on the film about the rise of Monday Night Football.

Along with director Chet Forte, Goodrich is credited with innovating in 1981 the use of a replay camera on the opposite side of the football field from the press box, which Goodrich dubbed "reverse-angle" replay.

Goodrich was the producer for the Monday Night Football game on Monday, December 8, 1980, the night John Lennon was killed. Goodrich relayed the news to Howard Cosell, who informed the television audience of Lennon's death.

Among the many highlights during Goodrich’s career at ABC Sports was serving as the producer for the network’s first-ever coverage of the Super Bowl, Super Bowl XIX, in January 1985 in Stanford, California. He also produced the Super Bowl XXV pre-game and halftime programs in Tampa, Florida in 1991.

Goodrich spearheaded ABC Sports’ coverage of college football as a producer for 22 years, and as coordinating producer for 12. In addition, he produced ABC Sports’ live coverage of the Indianapolis 500 for 16 consecutive years, having previously co-produced the network’s coverage of the world’s greatest auto race for seven years. He also served as a coordinating producer of the 1998 World Cup of Soccer (FIFA WORLD CUP).

For ABC's broadcasts of the Olympic Games, Goodrich was the producer of the basketball coverage at the 1976 Summer Olympics, the hockey coverage at the 1976 Winter Olympics and again at the 1984 Winter Olympics, speed skating at Lake Placid at the 1980 Winter Olympics, gymnastics in Los Angeles at the 1984 Summer Olympics and the Alpine coverage for the 1988 Winter Olympics in Calgary.

During his career, Goodrich also produced ABC’s major golf championship coverage including the U.S. Open, British Open and PGA Championship and many of the PGA Tour events. He also produced a variety of [Wide World of Sports] events, including the World Track & Field Championships, World Alpine Skiing Championships, boxing and other auto racing. Goodrich also served as producer for the North American Soccer League and ABC’s Monday Night Baseball telecasts. In addition to his successful career as a producer, Goodrich has also directed golf, auto racing and football telecasts.

Goodrich is currently a freelance television producer, director, and consultant for companies including ABC/ESPN, NFL Network, and SEC Network.

Among the well-known broadcasting personalities with whom Goodrich has worked are Howard Cosell, Jim McKay, Brent Musburger, Keith Jackson, Bob Griese, Jack Whitaker, Al Michaels, Frank Gifford, Brad Nessler, Paul Maguire, Chris Schenkel, Al Trautwig, and Chris Fowler.

== Awards and recognition ==
In 2014, Goodrich was on the list of the 500 Most Famous Dallasites Dead or Alive. While working as a graphics runner in 1970 for ABC Sports, he along with the stats person, Jerry Kapstein, invented two graphic stats—Time of Possession and Third Down Conversions— which have been used for nearly 50 years. Goodrich has received 16 Sports Emmy Awards, most recently as a producer for the 1990 Indy 500 coverage, which won the Emmy Award for Outstanding Live Sports Special. He also captured two Emmys as a co-producer of ABC’s coverage of the 1982 and 1989 Indianapolis 500. Goodrich also received one Emmy each as a producer for ABC’s coverage of the 1984 and 1976 Summer Olympics; one each for coverage of the 1976 and 1980 Winter Olympics; one as a producer for ABC’s NCAA Football series and five as a producer on ABC’s Wide World of Sports (1975, 1976, 1986, 1989 and 1990).

In addition to the 16 Sports Emmy Awards Goodrich has won, he has also been nominated for 29 additional Sports Emmy Awards, including a 2006 nomination for his work on ESPN College Football.

Goodrich has been recognized for his accomplishments during his high school football career at Woodrow Wilson High Schoolin by being voted a high school All-American and being inducted into the Texas Sports High School Hall of Fame in May 2009. Also in 2009, he was inducted into Woodrow Wilson High School’s Hall of Fame in recognition of his excellence as a student as well as his excellence as an athlete and for his lifetime of professional achievements.

== Credits (partial) ==
- 2013 NFL Network's Thursday Night Football (producer)
- 2006-2012 ESPN College Football (producer)
- 1998 World Cup of Soccer (FIFA World Cup) (coordinating producer)
- 1991 Super Bowl XXV pregame, halftime, post game (producer)
- 1990 New York City Marathon (producer)
- 1988 XV Olympic Winter Games (producer)
- 1987-2005 NCAA Football (producer, coordinating producer)
- 1985 Super Bowl XIX (producer)
- 1982 U.S. Open (golf) (producer)
- 1980-1986 NFL Monday Night Football (producer)
- 1980 XIII Olympic Winter Games (producer)
- 1980 Sugar Ray Leonard vs. Roberto Duran II (producer)
- 1976-1979 NCAA Football (producer)
- 1976 Games of the XXI Olympiad (producer)
- 1976 XXI Winter Olympic Games (producer)
- 1971-1996 ABC's Wide World of Sports (producer)
- 1970-2003 Indianapolis 500 (producer, associate producer, production assistant)

Also Multiple Years Producing:

- Open Golf Championship, also known as The British Open
- U.S. Open (golf)
- PGA Championship
- North American Soccer League
- ABC’s Monday Night Baseball
- American League Championship Game
