= Gayle Sierens =

American sports announcer (born 1954)

- Born: Gayle Sierens; June 4, 1954 (age 72)
- Education: Florida State University
- Occupations: News anchor Sports anchor
- Spouse: Mike Martin
- Children: 3

Gayle Sierens (born June 4, 1954) is an American former broadcast journalist and television news anchor on WFLA-TV.

== Early life and career ==
Sierens joined the Tampa NBC affiliate in 1977 as a weekend sports anchor and reporter after working with WFSU in Tallahassee while she was attending Florida State University. She became the first female sportscaster in the Bay Area and quickly made a reputation for herself as someone who always got the big story and interviewed the top professional sports players despite being a woman. In 1981, she was recognized by Tampa Bay Metro Magazine as the Bay Area's best sports reporter.

In 1984, Sierens was honored with a Florida Emmy Award for sports reporting and in 1991, she won her second Emmy for news reporting.

== Career at WFLA and NBC Sports ==
In an effort to curb declining ratings, WFLA promoted Sierens to co-anchor of the 6 & 11 p.m. newscasts with Bob Hite in October 1985, a move that was criticized at first. The move later paid off as Sierens was regarded as being likeable and just as intuitive doing news as doing sports.

In 1987, through a short stint with NBC Sports, Sierens became the first woman to do play-by-play for an NFL regular season football game when she called the December 27 game between the Seattle Seahawks and the Kansas City Chiefs. She was originally to be a regular play-by-play announcer for the season, but a contract dispute with WFLA prevented her from continuing in that role beyond her lone game. In 2017, Beth Mowins became only the second woman to call an NFL game and first woman to call a Monday Night Football broadcast. Here, the game was between the Los Angeles Chargers and Denver Broncos.

January 10, 2007 was designated as "Gayle Sierens Day" by Tampa Mayor Pam Iorio to commemorate Sierens' 30th year with the station, a rarity in television news.

Sierens retired from WFLA-TV NewsChannel 8 in May 2015, after 38 years in the broadcast journalism industry.

== Personal life ==
Currently, Sierens is on the board of directors for Village Partners International, an advisory board for the Boys' and Girls' Clubs of Greater Tampa, serves as chairperson for the Big Brother's/Big Sister's annual "Bowl for Kids' Sake" fundraiser, and is a member of the board of directors of the Judeo-Christian Health Clinic.

She is married to Mike Martin, former linebacker for the Chicago Bears and the New England Patriots, who owns the Mike's Pies in Tampa.
