= List of casinos in New York =

This is a list of casinos in New York.

== List of casinos ==
List of casinos in the U.S. state of New York
Casino	City	County	State	District	Type	Comments
Akwesasne Mohawk Casino	Hogansburg	Franklin	New York		Native American	Mohawk affiliated; Opened in 1999
Batavia Downs Casino	Batavia	Genesee	New York		Racino	Opened in 2005
Del Lago Resort and Casino	Tyre	Seneca	New York		Commercial	Live table games; Opened in 2017
Empire City Casino at Yonkers Raceway	Yonkers	Westchester	New York		Racino	Electronic table games; Opened in 2006
The Fairgrounds Gaming	Hamburg	Erie	New York		Racino	Opened in 2010
Jake's 58 Hotel & Casino	Islandia	Suffolk	New York		Commercial	Electronic table games; Opened in 2017
Finger Lakes Gaming and Race Track	Farmington	Ontario	New York		Racino	Opened in 2004
Lakeside Entertainment	Seneca Falls	Seneca	New York		Native American	Cayuga affiliated; Opened in 2022
Lakeside Entertainment	Union Springs	Cayuga	New York		Native American	Cayuga affiliated; Opened in 2014
Point Place Casino	Bridgeport	Madison	New York		Native American	Oneida affiliated; Opened in 2018
Resorts World Catskills	Kiamesha Lake	Sullivan	New York		Commercial	Live table games; Opened in 2018
Resorts World Hudson Valley	Newburgh	Orange	New York		Commercial	Opened in 2022
Resorts World New York City	Ozone Park	Queens	New York		Commercial	Live table games; Opened in 2011
Rivers Casino & Resort	Schenectady	Schenectady	New York		Commercial	Live table games; Opened in 2017
Saratoga Casino and Raceway	Saratoga Springs	Saratoga	New York		Racino	Opened in 2004
Seneca Allegany Casino	Salamanca	Cattaraugus	New York		Native American	Seneca affiliated; Opened in 2012
Seneca Buffalo Creek Casino	Buffalo	Erie	New York		Native American	Seneca affiliated; Opened in 2007
Seneca Gaming and Entertainment Irving	Irving	Cattaraugus	New York		Native American	Seneca affiliated
Seneca Gaming and Entertainment Oil Spring	Cuba	Allegany	New York		Native American	Seneca affiliated; Opened in 2014
Seneca Gaming and Entertainment Salamanca	Salamanca	Cattaraugus	New York		Native American	Seneca affiliated; Opened in 2004
Seneca Niagara Casino	Niagara Falls	Niagara	New York		Native American	Seneca affiliated; Opened in 2002
Tioga Downs & Casino	Nichols	Tioga	New York		Commercial	Live table games; Opened in 2006
Turning Stone Resort & Casino	Verona	Oneida	New York		Native American	Oneida affiliated; Opened in 1993
Vernon Downs & Casino	Vernon	Oneida	New York		Racino	Opened in 2006
Yellow Brick Road Casino	Chittenango	Madison	New York		Native American	Oneida affiliated; Opened in 2015

== List of closed casinos ==
One casino, Monticello Gaming & Raceway operated as a casino beginning in 2004 but ended its gaming operation in 2019. The racetrack is still open as of 2026.

== Gallery ==
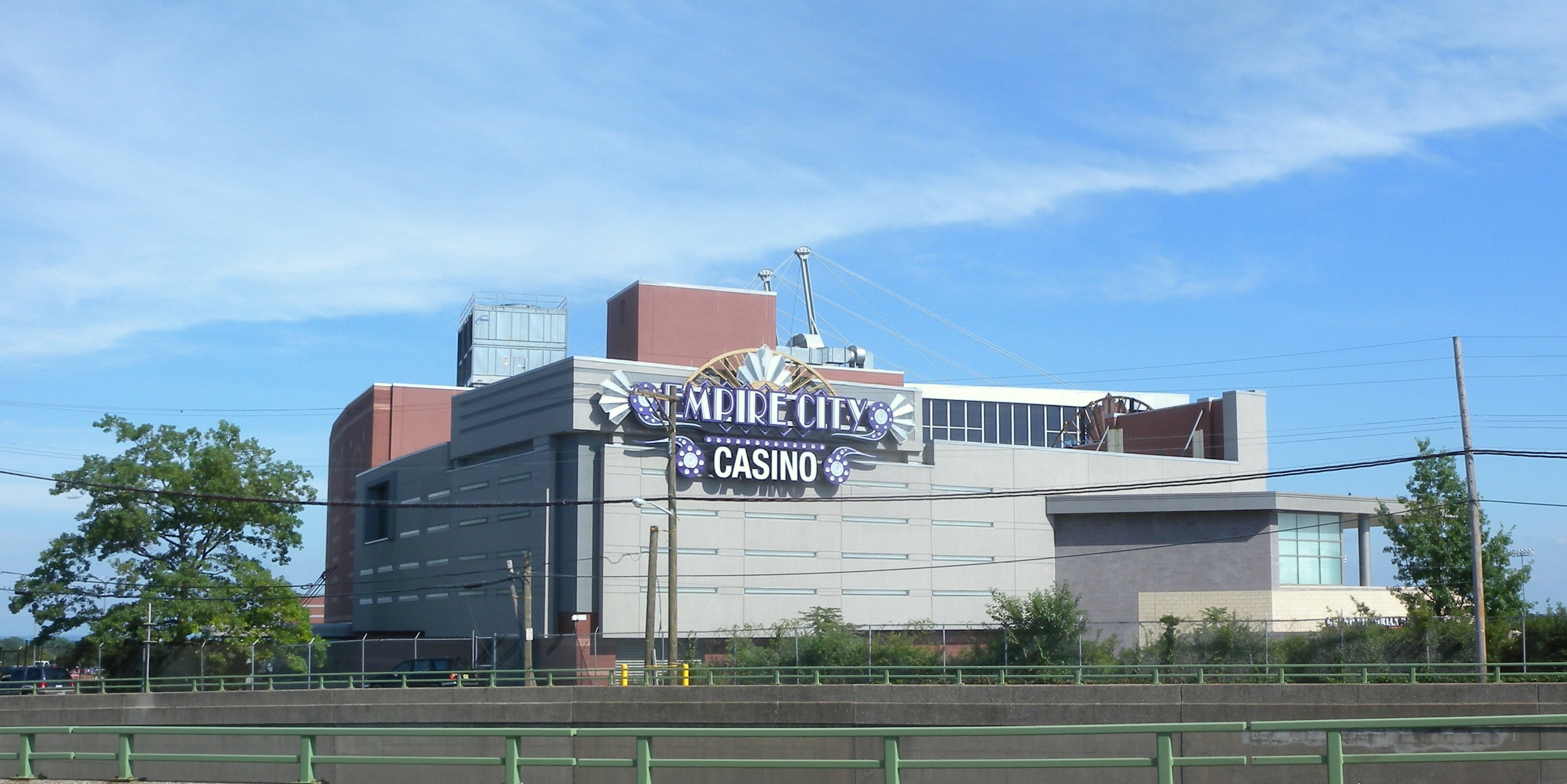
Empire City Casino

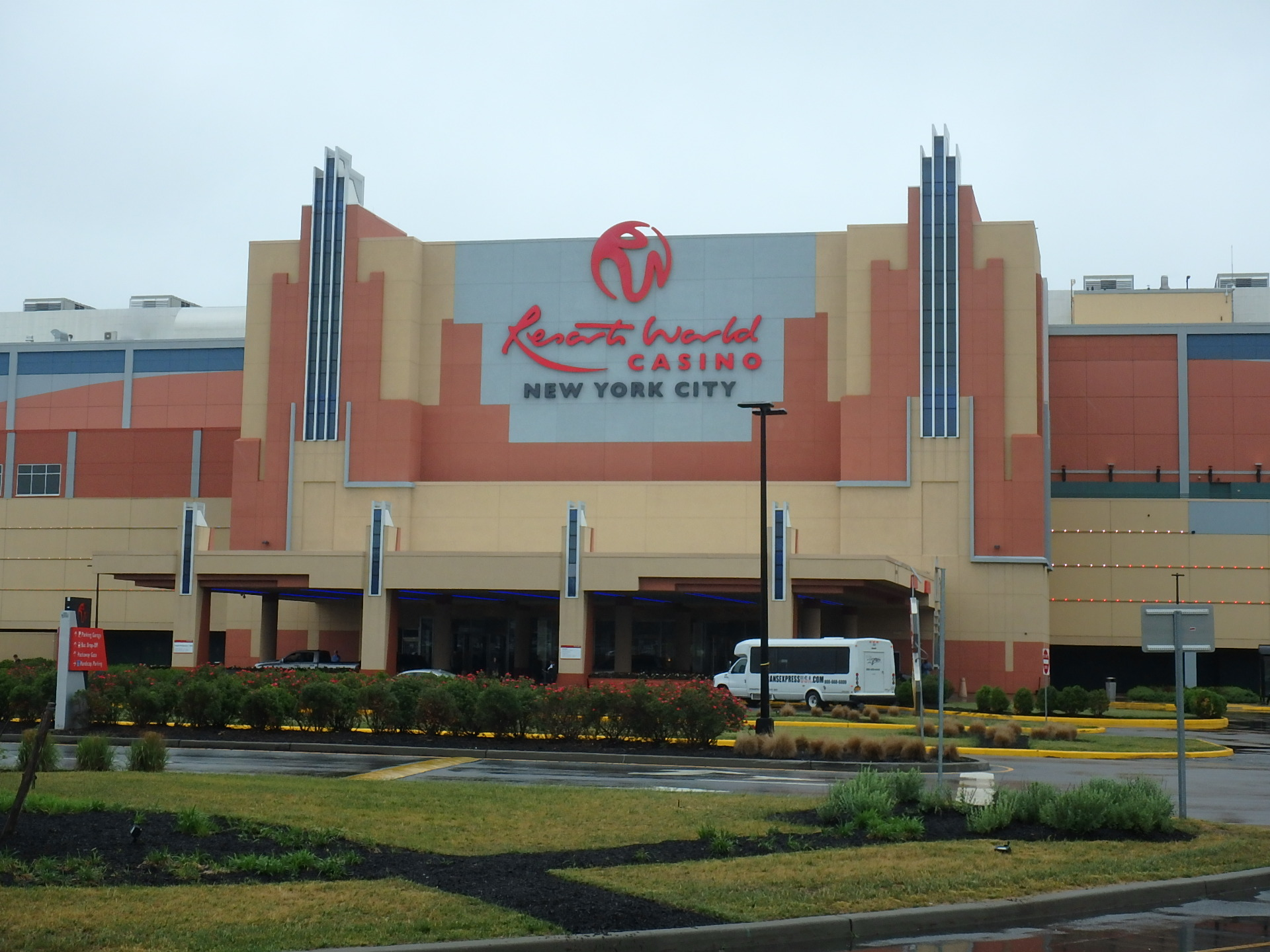
Resorts World New York City

== See also ==
- List of casinos in the United States
- List of casino hotels
