= Robert A. Berman =

American businessman of Monticello Raceway and Empire Resorts (born 1959)

- Born: December 8, 1959 (age 66); US
- Occupation: Businessman
- Years active: 1995–present
- Notable work: Empire Resorts, Monticello Raceway
- Spouses: Valerie J Berman (m. 2011) Debbie N. Berman (m. 1983–2007)
- Children: JB Berman, Alan M. Berman

Robert A. Berman (born December 8, 1959) is an American businessman known for his contributions to the casino industry in the US. He has owned and directed several prominent organizations and companies including Empire Resorts and Monticello Raceway. He has also formed partnerships with numerous institutional investors, which led to the acquisition of hotel properties across the US. Berman's plans to develop a casino 90 miles from New York City led to a contentious battle with Donald Trump that later led to Trump receiving the largest fine in the history of New York State's lobbying commission. He was involved in several projects concerning the development of Native American gaming in the New York and Idaho area. Now working as GP of Avon Road Partners, LP. Leading daughter JB Berman into the family business.

== Early life ==
Robert A. Berman's father, Pip Berman, was a building contractor known for expanding the Concord Resort Hotel and the Imperial Room nightclub where Milton Berle, Sid Caesar, Buddy Hackett, Joan Rivers and Jerry Seinfeld performed. At 19 years of age, Robert A. Berman received the first mass gathering permit to operate an outdoor music festival in Sullivan County, New York where a decade earlier the 1969 Woodstock Music Festival was held. Collaborating with music impresario Sid Bernstein on the site of the former Avon Lodge Hotel in Woodridge, New York, Berman opened Music Mountain hosting artists including the Doobie Brothers, members of the Grateful Dead as the Jerry Garcia Band and Bobby and the Midnites, Ozzy Osbourne, The Allman Brothers Band, Santana and various others.

== Career ==
From 1995 to 2000, Berman co-founded and served as chairman and chief executive officer of Hospitality Worldwide Services (HWS), a publicly traded platform that became one of the most prominent service providers in the Hospitality Industry. By 1998, HWS had several thousand employees with offices around the world.

From 1995 to 2000, Berman formed partnerships with institutional investors including ING and Apollo Global Management, which led to the acquisition of more than $100M worth of hotel properties including the Warwick Hotel in Philadelphia and the Radisson Hotel at Chicago's O’Hare International Airport, amongst others. In 1996 he formed Catskill Development, LLC and purchased Monticello Racetrack. During this time Berman worked towards building a Casino in partnership with the St. Regis Mohawk Reservation Tribe of New York. In 2002 Stanley Tollman, founder of The Travel Corporation, assigned Berman to manage Alpha Hospitality, a public company directed by Tollman that aimed at administering a Casino for the Mohawk tribe. In 2003 he merged Catskill Development with Alpha Hospitality, creating Empire Resorts.

From 2002 to 2005, Berman served as chairman and chief executive officer for Empire Resorts, a publicly traded NASDAQ ("NYNY") gaming company.

Berman is also General Partner of Avon Road Partners, LP a private entity that owns Real Estate and broadcast assets, including WVOS (AM) & FM. Berman is now working with partner and daughter JB Berman (Jena Berman) as of 2019. Avon's objective of deploying capitol into development, the home building business, Commercial Real Estate. Currently, the development of Glenwild Land Co. 560k Sq ft of approved warehouse space, plans included 2M sq ft of e-commerce space and mixed residential for the remaining 450 acres. In March 2016, Berman and James (Jim) McCarthy founded KeyStone Solutions, Inc. which later Robert led into a public offering under the new company established: Rekor (REKR NASDAQ)

== Donald Trump controversy ==
In 1993 Berman began a project involving an Internet lottery venture in collaboration with the Coeur d'Alene people tribe in Idaho. The project campaigned towards bringing Native American gaming to the Catskill area. This led to federal approval to build the St. Regis Mohawk casino at Monticello Raceway in 2000, which caused rivalry with other regional casino owners, particularly Donald Trump. Trump funded an ad campaign to block the casino from being built by targeting the Mohawk tribe. Anti-Mohawk ads appeared in various newspapers suggesting the negative impact a Native American casino would have on the region. This resulted in Donald Trump receiving an unprecedented fine of $250,000 for secretly funding a lobbying campaign against Native American casinos.

== Native American gaming ==
In 1994 Berman worked with the Coeur d'Alene people to device the National Indian Lottery via the Indian Gaming Regulatory Act. The project led to the creation of the Coeur d’Alene Casino in Idaho on land donated in trust to the tribe for the project. Berman also worked with the Mohawk people to develop a casino in the Catskill region, New York. In 1998 the National Indian Gaming Commission approved the project to develop and operate a gaming facility on tribal lands. In 1999 the Mohawk people signed the deal with Caesars Entertainment Corporation instead. This led to a multibillion-dollar lawsuit that was eventually dismissed.

== Personal life ==
Robert Berman has been married to Valerie J. Berman since 2011. His previous spouse is Debbie N. Berman, with whom he had two children, Alan Michael Berman and Jena Beth Berman. He and his family currently reside in Washington D.C.

== See also ==
- Monticello Raceway
- Empire Resorts
- Coeur d’Alene Casino
- Native American gaming
