= New York Lottery =

Lottery of the U.S. state of New York

- Formation: 1967
- Type: Lottery System
- Headquarters: Schenectady, New York, United States
- Website: nylottery.ny.gov

The New York Lottery is the state-operated lottery in the US state of New York that began in 1967. As part of the New York State Gaming Commission, it provides revenue for public education and is based in Schenectady.

== Overview ==
Players must be at least 18 (including video lottery); however, the minimum is 21 for Quick Draw (a keno game drawn four minutes apart) where alcohol is served.

Lottery winnings are subject to state and Federal income taxes. New York City and Yonkers residents also are subject to local income taxes.

== History ==
On November 8, 1966, New Yorkers voted to approve a constitutional amendment authorizing a government-run lottery. The referendum passed with over 60% in favor. The proceeds of the Lottery were to be "applied exclusively to, or in aid or support of education." In 1967, the New York Legislature created a Division of the Lottery and a Lottery Commission within the Department of Taxation and Finance. The Lottery later became an autonomous unit within the Department of Taxation and Finance. Under the New York State Lottery for Education Law, the director of the Division of the Lottery has full authority over the administration of the Lottery.

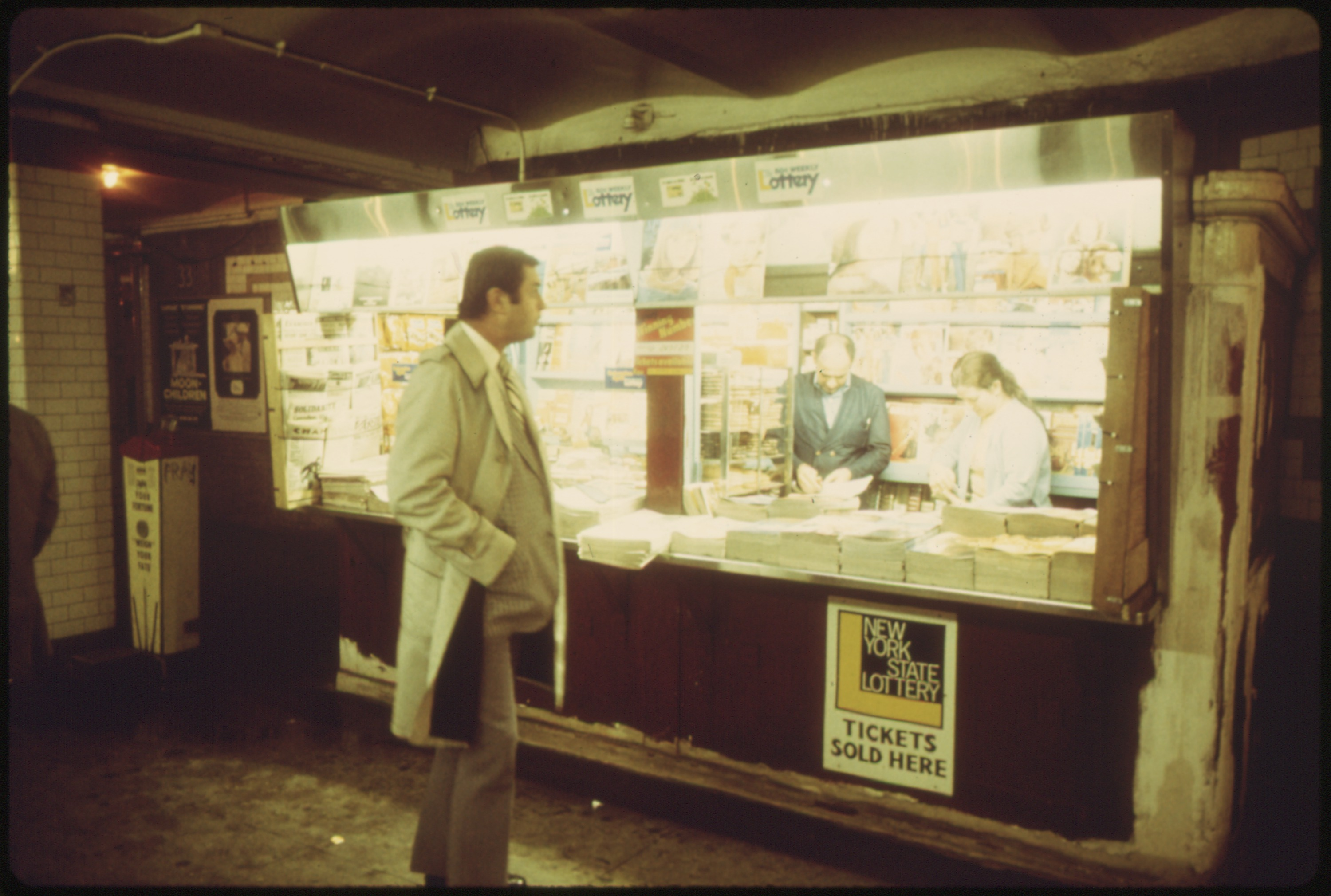
Magazine stand selling New York Lottery tickets in 1974.

The Lottery began in 1967; its first slogan was "Your Chance of a Lifetime to Help Education". It has generated over $34 billion in aid to education revenue.

New York governor Hugh Carey suspended sales for about nine months in 1975-76 due to a scandal involving unsold tickets being selected as winners. Another scandal in 1986 involved state employees manipulating mail-in tickets in a mail room to result in over $40,000 in winning to friends and family.

The first big winner of the Lottery was Lou Eisenberg, who won $5 million in 1981; in that era, winners could not choose cash in lieu of annuity payments.

An agreement between Mega Millions and Powerball was reached in October 2009. All lotteries then with either game were allowed to sell tickets for both games beginning January 31, 2010; New York was among those which joined the "other" game on that date.

On February 1, 2013, the Lottery's operations were merged with that of the New York State Racing and Wagering Board to form the New York State Gaming Commission.

== Current draw games ==
=== In-house draw games ===
==== Numbers ====
Numbers is a three-digit draw game drawn twice daily. Three digits from 0 through 9 are drawn. The minimum wager is 50 cents, except for combination wagers.

==== Win-4 ====
Played as Numbers, but with a four chambered drawing machine. As with Numbers, the minimum wager is 50 cents, except for combination wagers.

==== Take 5 ====
Take 5 began in 1992 as a Friday-only game, then called Take Five; it has since expanded gradually to nightly drawings beginning in 2000. Starting July 26, 2021, Take 5 drawings take place twice daily like Numbers and Win-4 games does. Games are $1 each. Five numbers from 1 through 39 are drawn. First prize rolls down if there is no 5-of-5 winner. Matching 5, 4, or 3 numbers wins a parimutuel cash prize; matching 2 numbers wins a free Take 5 play. Overall odds of winning (including the free play) are 1 in 9; odds of winning cash, 1 in 100; odds of winning the top prize are 1 in 575,757. According to TV and radio ads, there had been an average of about 100,000 winners daily.

The Lottery has, for promotional purposes, added a "bonus ball" to Take 5. In these drawings, there are eight prize levels; such drawings allow winning with just one number, plus the bonus ball.

This game was an evolution from a prior game called Cash 40, which as a minor difference had 40 numbers (of which, 6 were drawn) rather than the 39 found in Take 5. Commercials advertised that the Cash 40 game was going to "Take Five" - forever.

==== Pick 10 ====
Pick 10 is drawn nightly; 20 numbers from 1 through 80 are drawn. Players choose 10 numbers; games cost $1 each. Matching 10 of the 20 numbers wins $500,000 cash; the top prize has a $5,000,000 liability limit.

Unlike Quick Draw (which also picks 20 of 80 numbers; see below), Pick 10 is available wherever Lottery draw games are sold, including Quick Draw retailers.

==== Lotto ====
Lotto is drawn Wednesdays and Saturdays. A $1 play consists of 2 games. Six from 1 to 59 numbers are drawn, followed by a bonus ball from the remaining 53 numbers. Matching three numbers wins $1; other winners share parimutuel prizes.

As the payout percentage in Lotto is a statutory 40%, sales of the game have been in a years-long decline, especially since the addition of Mega Millions(in 2002) and Powerball(in 2010) to the Lottery's portfolio, and the expansion of Cash4Life to nightly drawings; of these three, only Mega Millions is not drawn the same nights as Lotto.

Lotto began in 1978. In the late 1990s, the starting Lotto jackpot was $3 million or $4 million, with the first rollover advertised at $10 million. The jackpot was reduced from $3 million to $2 million in April 2013. In September 2019, the minimum rollover was reduced to $100,000 in part due to poor sales.

==== Quick Draw ====
Quick Draw is a keno-style game drawn every four minutes from 4:04 a.m. to 3:24 a.m. Players choose from 1 through 10 numbers; a computer draws 20 numbers from 1 through 80. Minimum play is $1. Options and vary; the 10-spot game has a top prize of $100,000. It is played at a limited number of Lottery retailers with a monitor showing the drawings; many of these establishments serve alcoholic beverages. The minimum age for playing Quick Draw is 21 where alcohol is served, while it is 18 elsewhere, including liquor stores.

=== Multi-jurisdictional games ===
==== Cash4Life ====
On June 13, 2014, New York and New Jersey began sales of Cash4Life, which replaced Sweet Million in New York (see below.) The first drawing was on June 16. Cash4Life drawings are held live nightly (formerly Monday and Thursday evenings) at 9pm Eastern Time on Livestream. Games are $2 each.

Cash4Life is played much as in Mega Millions and Powerball; players choose 5 of 60 numbers in the main field, and 1 of 4 green "Cash Ball" numbers in the second field (the "4" in the game's name reflects the second set of numbers.) The top prize is $1,000-per-day-for-life; second prize is $1,000-per-week-for-life. A winner of either "lifetime" prize can choose cash ($7 million or $1 million, respectively) in lieu of lifetime payments. The prize pool is 55 percent of sales.

As of 2019, nine states offer Cash4Life.

==== Mega Millions ====
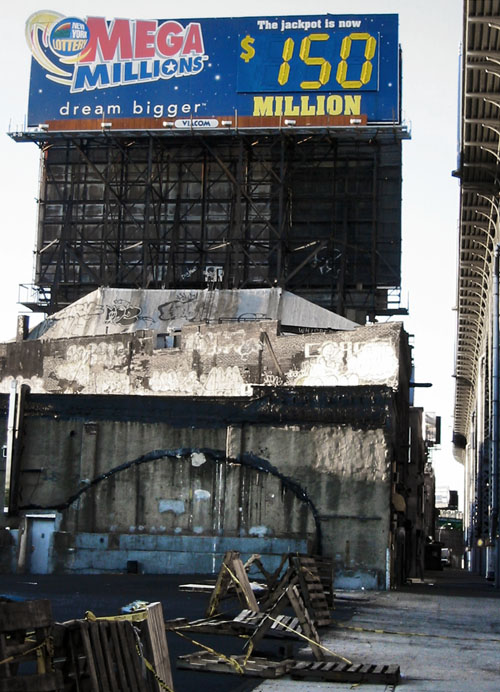
A billboard promoting the New York Lottery's Mega Millions on 125th Street in New York City.

Drawn Tuesdays and Fridays, Mega Millions draws five balls numbered 01 through 70, and a sixth number (the gold-colored "Mega Ball"), numbered 01 through 25. Mega Millions plays are $5 each. The price was increased (basically doubling the cost of the ticket and adding the MEGAPLIER to all tickets) The minimum jackpot in Mega Millions is $40,000,000.

Mega Millions began in 1996 as The Big Game. Six years later, the New York and Ohio lotteries joined simultaneously on May 17, 2002; the game was temporarily rebranded The Big Game Mega Millions. The Megaplier (a multiplier of 2, 3, 4, or 5), initially a Texas-only option, eventually became available in all MM jurisdictions, except in California. New York adopted the Megaplier option in 2011.

Mega Millions is offered in 44 states, the District of Columbia and the U.S. Virgin Islands.

==== Powerball ====
New York joined Powerball (offered in 46 jurisdictions) on January 31, 2010, after a cross-sell agreement allowed the game to be sold alongside Mega Millions. Powerball is the US drawing game with the highest prize potential. Each game is $2; with Power Play, $3. The minimum jackpot is $40,000,000. Players choose 5 numbers from a field of 69, and a Powerball from 1 through 26. Drawings are Mondays, Wednesdays, and Saturdays.

== Former draw games ==
=== Monopoly Millionaires' Club ===
The New York Lottery was among 22 states and the District of Columbia to launch Monopoly Millionaires' Club (MMC) on October 19, 2014. Drawings were Fridays from October 24 through December 26.

Poor sales, mostly because of player confusion, were blamed. The MMC game returned as a $5 scratchcard game in spring 2015. A television game show was produced for MMC players who won a trip to Las Vegas. Episodes began broadcasting beginning in late March. MMC scratchcard players also are eligible to appear on the game show, hosted by Billy Gardell.

=== Sweet Million ===
Sweet Million (which ran from 2009 to 2014) was drawn Monday and Thursday nights. Players could choose (or have the terminal select) six numbers for each $1 game. Six numbers were drawn from a pool of 40 numbers. Matching three numbers would win $3, four numbers, $40, five numbers, $500. Matching all six numbers wins $1,000,000, payable in a lump sum; in the unlikely event there were more than five top-prize winners, they split $5,000,000 (the highest number of tickets winning in a given drawing was two.) The payout percentage in Sweet Million was 50%.

The final Sweet Million drawing was on June 12, 2014, after which it was replaced by Cash4Life.

=== Millennium Millions ===
Prior to the New York Lottery's entry into Mega Millions, the Lottery offered two series of "Millennium Millions" drawings (December 31, 1999; and three in 2000.) Its structure was similar to Mega Millions in that players chose five numbers out of one pool, and a sixth number from a second pool. Both jackpots were at least $100 million when they were won (both jackpots were the largest offered by the Lottery at the time). Unlike regular jackpot games, Millennium Millions was unique in that when the jackpot was won, the drawing to be held the following week was not offered (as such, there was no advance play for the game.) There were no Millennium Millions drawings in 2001, as the New York Lottery approved legislation for joining what is now known as Mega Millions.

Millennium Millions differed from Mega Millions in that plays were $2 each (at the time The Big Game's play was $1), all prizes were pari-mutuel, and that there was no prize for matching only the "Millennium Ball". The game's double matrix was 5/50 + 1/25, identical to the then-The Big Game, which became The Big Game Mega Millions when New York joined.

=== Lucky Day ===
A game briefly available in the late 1990s where players tried to pick the date, month, and year of a day in the 20th century. The game was the only Lottery draw game (except for Quick Draw and Monopoly Millionaire′s Club) in that its drawings were held on a computer instead of using manual balls; Lucky Day also gave a sole top-prize winner the option of a "bonus prize" in lieu of part of the cash.

=== Local Lotto ===
Players chose six numbers from a field of 31. The game was "marketed" under four different names based on the region the ticket was sold ("Big Apple", "Long Island," "Upstate", and "Western New York").

== Video lottery ==
Available at eight parimutuel facilities:

- Batavia Downs, Batavia
- Finger Lakes Gaming and Race Track, Farmington
- The Fairgrounds Gaming, Hamburg
- Saratoga Casino and Raceway, Saratoga Springs (not to be confused with nearby Saratoga Race Course)
- Tioga Downs, Nichols
- Vernon Downs, Vernon
- Empire City at Yonkers Raceway, Yonkers
- Aqueduct Racetrack, Ozone Park, Queens

New York video lottery, by law, offers a 92% minimum payout percentage.

=== Former ===
- Monticello Raceway, Monticello - Casino closed on April 23, 2019 due to loss of business from Resorts World Catskills, although the track continues to operate as of 2025.

== Instant games ==
Numerous scratchcard games are available; formats, prices, and payouts vary, although most of the higher-priced games are in fact the same game, repackaged under different names.

== Drawings ==
As of 2022, New York Lottery drawings air statewide on the following television stations:

- Binghamton: WICZ-TV
- Buffalo: WUTV, WNYO-TV
- Elmira: WETM-TV
- New York City: WABC-TV, WXTV-DT (in Spanish), MSG Network
- Plattsburgh: WPTZ, WNNE
- Rochester: WUHF
- Schenectady: WCWN
- Syracuse: WSTM-TV
- Utica: WUTR, WFXV

=== Hosts ===
Among the in-house On-Air Draw Team:

- Jennifer Dahnke
- Peadar Cleary
- Russell Roberts
