= Phil Greenwald =

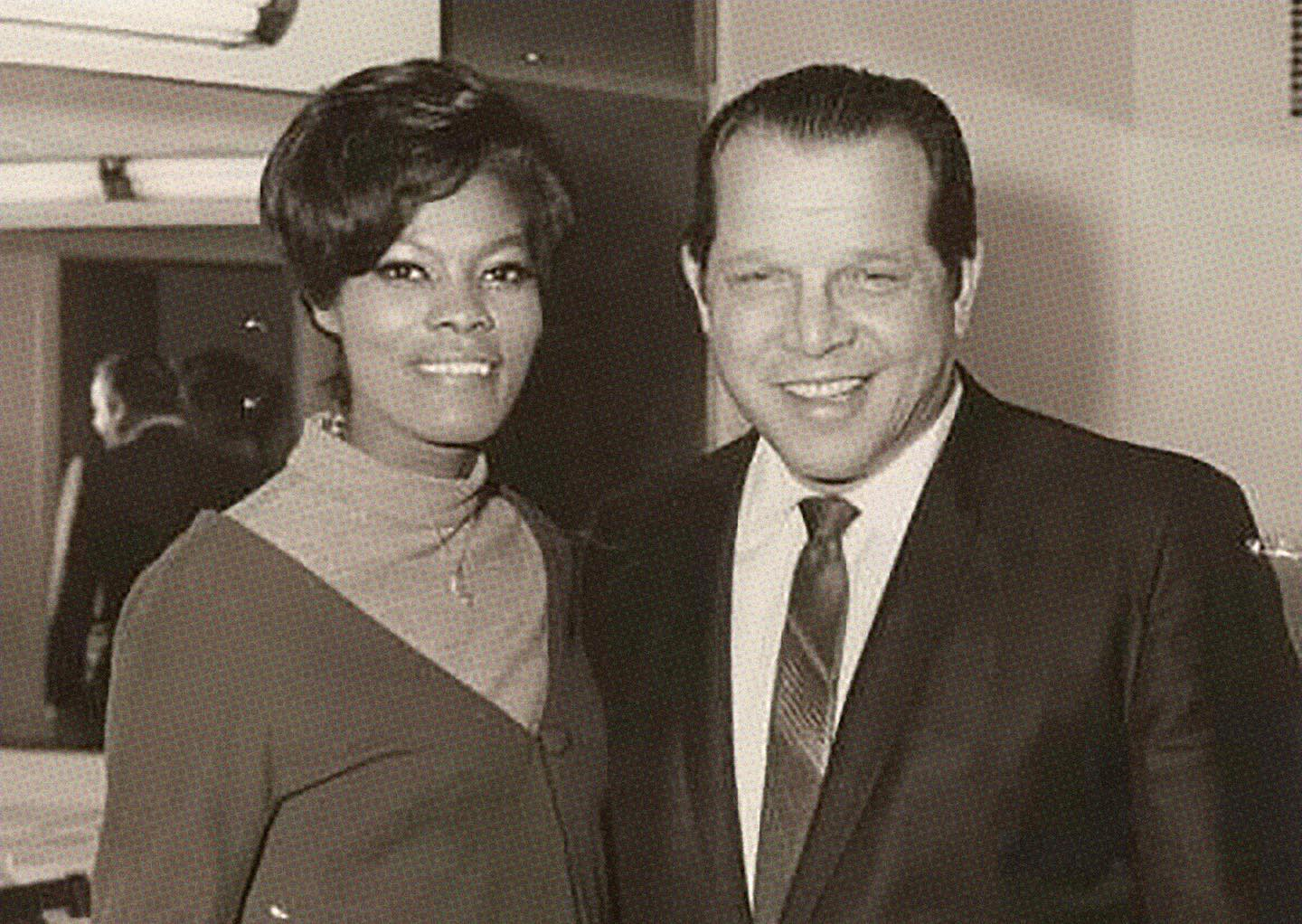
- Phil Greenwald and Dionne Warwick at the Concord Hotel in the 1960s
- Born: Phillip Greenwald; August 31, 1918; Lower East Side, Manhattan, New York City, U.S.A.
- Died: January 18, 1982 (Aged 63); Upper East Side, Manhattan, New York City, U.S.A.
- Occupations: Talent booker and Director of Entrainment and Production
- Employer(s): Concord Hotel, the Friars Club, the el San Juan in Puerto Rico, and Caesars Palace
- Spouse: Janie Greenwald
- Children: Joe and Abraham Greenwald
- Parent(s): Abraham Greenwald; Lilian Greenwald
- Relatives: Dr. Harold Greenwald (brother b.1910); Milton Greenwald/Michael Kidd (brother b.1915)

Phil Greenwald (also known as Philip "Phil or Philly" Greenwald) (August 31, 1918 – January 18, 1982) was a Jewish-American social icon in the entertainment industry of his day. He could be described as a celebrity among celebrities, who worked as a successful talent booker for the Concord Hotel. He was also the director of Entertainment and the producer for the Concord's Imperial room (which at that time was the largest nightclub in the world as designed by Morris Lapidus). His influence and ability to get many of the most famous celebrities of his time to entertain at the Concord helped add to the fame of not only the Concord, but the greater Borscht Belt and Catskill mountain area and advanced the Jewish cultural influence in the region.

== Origins and early career ==
Phil Greenwald was born on the Lower East Side of Manhattan in New York City to Abraham and Lilian Greenwald, who came to America as refugees from Tsarist Russia. He was the youngest of three brothers. Before Phil Greenwald was born, Abraham Greenwald made arrangements to have Lilian's cousin Arthur Winarick immigrate from Russia to the United States. The two men later became business partners and opened up a barbershop in New York City. Later, as the two became more successful Abraham became one of the founding members of the Journeymen Barbers' International Union of America and Arthur invented Jeris hair tonic, where he became a multi million dollar business tycoon in the American barber supply industry. At one point Abraham would also become a founder of the New York City Central Labor Council, and in the 1920s ran unsuccessfully for state and local offices in the Socialist Party.

For his part, Arthur eventually used his profits to purchase various properties in Kiamesha Lake, New York including the Concord Plaza in 1936. Arthur combined the properties, brought them together, and incorporated them into Concord Hotel. Arthur's enterprise quickly grew, as he spared no expense in making the Concord luxurious in both furnishings and entertainment. While this occurred, Arthur began buying other nearby hotels and properties to expand the Concord. With increased popularity the Concord became open year round in 1943 and by the 1950s the Concord began to outshine Grossinger's, which was the Concord's main rival and before the rise of the Concord was considered the most opulent of the Catskill Mountain resorts.

It was during the early rise of the Concord that Phil Greenwald began to come into his own. Phil was the Cousin-in-law once removed of the original owner Winarick. Winarick hired him to be a lifeguard at the Concord in 1935, and later he became a cashier. It was around this time that Phil began to connect with the Concord's talent bookers who began introducing him to contemporary talent. By the 1950s Phil became the sole exclusive talent booker for the Concord, coinciding with Concord's dominance in the Borscht Belt.

== Professional career ==
=== Ability to bring in celebrity talent ===
Phil Greenwald's ability to hire talent for excellent deals dramatically increased the profits and the fame of the Concord. For instance in 1955, when Phil first became the exclusive talent booker, one of his most famous feats was acquiring the talents of Tony Martin and Milton Berle (Mr. Television). At the time, both of these men were world famous Jewish American entertainers at the height of their stardom. Phil was able to entice the services of both Martin and Berle after claiming to each that he already had booked the other for an upcoming show. This subterfuge secured the enlistment of both stars. In a similar vain Greenwald once got Sophie Tucker, Joe E. Lewis, and Harry Richman to play back to back for a show. Greenwald believed this was his greatest feat as a talent booker. Phil was also known to spot entertainers money at the Monticello Raceway and other gambling venues in exchange for booking them for an event at the Concord. At one point Phil used this method to entice Yul Brynner to sing at the Concord.

In one instance, Greenwald had the opportunity to book Elvis Presley for the Concord before the singer's rise to fame. According to the account, he received a call from the William Morris agency, which asked for $50 to book a young Country and Western singer. Greenwald scoffed "Country and Western? I wouldn't have that in my hotel for anything in the world, no matter the price." The agency representative replied, "But he's good." Greenwald retorted, "Good for him. I wish him the best of luck, but I'll pass. What's his name anyway?" The agency answered "Elvis Presley."

=== Face and "prop" (propagandist) of the Concord ===
Greenwald developed a keen ability to market the Concord. He became friends with the tabloid columnist and radio hosts Walter Winchell and Ed Sullivan. In one instance he persuaded Winchell to put in a segment on his newspaper that Bess Myerson (the first Jewish Miss America) that "Phil Greenwald and Bess Myerson are a four person blaze.", implying that they were in a fiery relationship. When Myerson protested to the Concord and Greenwald had Winchell write a retraction which stated ""Phil Greenwald and Bess Myerson are not a four person blaze." The intrigue of this and similar exchanges, made the Concord even more attractive to the celebrity elite who frequented the Concord. Inspired by these shenanigans, Greenwald began publishing the Concord Evening News, a specialized newspaper distributed to all the current and former guests of the Concord. The papers gave a calendar of events, along with a list of all the big name stars performing in the seasons. Often the articles created humorous tabloid style rumors about the most prominent guests that was considered endearing and comical for the time. This humor was enjoyed by audiences despite that hints of scandal were often implied. As Phil's success as a marketer grew Winchell decided to write about Greenwald where he called him "Phil Greenwald: Prop. of the Concord" or in other words the propagandist of the Concord. Winarick of course was the owner, of the Concord, but his keeping a low pro-file and Greenwald's magnetism unofficially made him the face of the Concord.

=== Known instances of practical jokes ===
During Greenwald's time as a booker, his interactions with the guests and staff gave him the reputation of an unofficial offstage performer and a prankster. Some of these pranks were simple such as putting Tabasco in scotch or salt in coffee, while others were more elaborate. However, putting together Greenwald's antics and his newspaper tabloid gossip, these acts of mischief added to the artificial air of drama surrounding the Concord. As such, the Concord's frequent guests were known to inquire "What's the latest Philly Greenwald story?"

A case of one of his more intricate pranks occurred when Greenwald ate with the comedy duo Allen & Rossi (Marty Allen and Steve Rossi). The trio had breakfast, lunch, and dinner at the El San Juan Hotel in Puerto Rico, and Greenwald would not let them sign the checks. During their time together Greenwald checked out a day early, and Allen and Rossi received a bill. Greenwald had been signing the checks in their name.

During another instance, Pat Henry was contracted for the Concord when he got a call to be the opening act for Frank Sinatra in Palm Springs for the first time. Greenwald told Henry that he would arranged for a limo to take him on a booked flight to John F. Kennedy Airport. After Henry left Phil called airport security claiming to be Pat Henry and that a man was impersonating him and had stolen his ID, credit cards, and tickets. Henry was subsequently detained at the gate, and Henry did not get a chance to work under Sinatra again until 1958, at the 500 Club in Atlantic City.

At a later period, Greenwald offered to buy Tony Martin a gift. Martin asked for a small dog. Greenwald got him a Saint Bernard puppy named Gypsy, which much to Martin's distaste, Gypsy grew rapidly and caused him much financial, logistical, and travel grief.

There was another case, where Jerry Vale was performing at the Concord and Greenwald entered his dressing room carrying a box of children's shoes. Greenwald dumped the shoes on the floor and informed Vale that his family were in the shoe business and to pick out any shoes he wanted for his children. Vale felt indebted to Greenwald for giving him his big break at the Concord so rather than embarrass him by declining his offer, Vale got on his knees and began sifting through the shoes. Greenwald enthusiastically goaded Vale and encouraged him to grab whatever shoes he desired. After selecting between 5 or 6 shoes and attempting to match the pairs, he realized that all the shoes were left footed.

== Personal life ==
Phil Greenwald had two brothers, Dr. Harold Greenwald and Milton Greenwald (better known as Michael Kidd) who were both at one point hired by Phil to work at the Concord. Dr. Harold was the concord's staff lecturer. He was a psychologist who was noted for writing the international bestseller The Call Girl and would often give a lecture called "How to stay married." Kidd on the other hand, was hired on as the staff drummer for events. However, it was Phil who worked for the Concord the longest and grew famous for his work there.

Phil's association with his brother Kidd is most famously liken to a mistaken story that supposed that Kidd got his name his connection to Phil while working at the Concord. It is commonly believed that Michael was frequently referred to as "Philly's Kid Brother" due to his brother's prominence in the entertainment industry. However, it's unlikely this played a significant role in his choice of name. In reality, Michael was actually the middle child of the two siblings and older than Phil, so the idea that he was called "kid" by his younger brother is specious at best. In actuality, Kidd legally changed his name in 1942. That same year, while performing with the American Ballet Caravan, Michael Kidd with his fellow dancers were encouraged to adopt more "American" name. The most likely reason he chose the name Kidd is that he drew inspiration from his role as Billy the Kid in Aaron Copland's 1938 ballet of the same name (Billy the Kid (ballet)), and again in Copland's 1942 Rodeo.

== Death ==
Phil died at the age of 63 at Lenox Hill Hospital in New York City Manhattan, in 1982
