= Julio Iglesias World Tour =

1984–85 concert tour by Julio Iglesias

- Tour by Julio Iglesias
- Associated album: 1100 Bel Air Place
- Start date: June 15, 1984
- End date: January 27, 1985
- No. of shows: 124
- Attendance: 1,000,000

Julio Iglesias World Tour was a concert tour by Julio Iglesias to promote his first English album 1100 Bel Air Place. The tour consisted of 124 shows with a length of 7 months and ran through 33 US and Canadian cities, Europe, South Africa, Australia and the Orient. The tour sold around 1 million tickets. Iglesias signed a three-year deal with Coca-Cola and was the tour sponsor, three months after Pepsi's deal with Michael Jackson.

== History ==
The tour take him to 33 US and Canadian cities, Europe, South Africa, Australia and the Orient.

== Opening acts ==
- Michael Davis (US & Canada)

== Tour dates ==
List of concerts, showing date, city, country and venue
Date	City	Country	Venue
North America
15 June 1984	San Juan	Puerto Rico	Convention Center
16 June 1984	San Juan	Puerto Rico	Roberto Clemente Coliseum
22 June 1984	Denver	United States	Red Rocks Amphitheatre
23 June 1984	Albuquerque	United States	Tingley Coliseum
24 June 1984	Phoenix	United States	Celebrity Theatre
28 June 1984	Lake Tahoe	United States	Caesars Tahoe Palace
29 June 1984	Lake Tahoe	United States	Caesars Tahoe Palace
30 June 1984	Lake Tahoe	United States	Caesars Tahoe Palace
1 July 1984	Lake Tahoe	United States	Caesars Tahoe Palace
2 July 1984	Lake Tahoe	United States	Caesars Tahoe Palace
3 July 1984	Lake Tahoe	United States	Caesars Tahoe Palace
5 July 1984	Las Vegas	United States	MGM Grand Hotel
6 July 1984	Las Vegas	United States	MGM Grand Hotel
7 July 1984	Las Vegas	United States	MGM Grand Hotel
8 July 1984	Las Vegas	United States	MGM Grand Hotel
9 July 1984	Las Vegas	United States	MGM Grand Hotel
10 July 1984	Las Vegas	United States	MGM Grand Hotel
11 July 1984	Las Vegas	United States	MGM Grand Hotel
13 July 1984	Las Cruces	United States	Pan American Center
14 July 1984	Houston	United States	The Summit
15 July 1984	Dallas	United States	Convention Center
17 July 1984	New Orleans	United States	1984 World Expo
18 July 1984	New Orleans	United States	1984 World Expo
21 July 1984	Berkeley	United States	Greek Theatre
22 July 1984	Berkeley	United States	Greek Theatre
26 July 1984	Los Angeles	United States	Universal Amphitheatre
27 July 1984	Los Angeles	United States	Universal Amphitheatre
28 July 1984	Los Angeles	United States	Universal Amphitheatre
29 July 1984	Los Angeles	United States	Universal Amphitheatre
30 July 1984	Los Angeles	United States	Universal Amphitheatre
31 July 1984	Los Angeles	United States	Universal Amphitheatre
1 August 1984	Los Angeles	United States	Universal Amphitheatre
2 August 1984	Los Angeles	United States	Universal Amphitheatre
3 August 1984	Los Angeles	United States	Universal Amphitheatre
4 August 1984	Los Angeles	United States	Universal Amphitheatre
8 August 1984	Milwaukee	United States	State Fairgrounds
10 August 1984	Detroit	United States	Pine Knob Music Theatre
11 August 1984	Detroit	United States	Pine Knob Music Theatre
13 August 1984	Philadelphia	United States	Mann Music Center
14 August 1984	Boston	United States	Boston Common
16 August 1984	Toronto	Canada	CNE Grandstand
17 August 1984	Montreal	Canada	Montreal Forum
18 August 1984	Ottawa	Canada	Canadian Central Expo
20 August 1984	Cleveland	United States	Blossom Music Center
21 August 1984	Saratoga	United States	Performing Arts Center
24 August 1984	Chicago	United States	Rosemont Horizon
25 August 1984	Chicago	United States	Rosemont Horizon
27 August 1984	Saint Paul	United States	Minnesota State Fair
29 August 1984	Syracuse	United States	State Fairgrounds
30 August 1984	Wantagh	United States	Jones Beach Theater
31 August 1984	Columbia	United States	Merriweather Post Pavilion
1 September 1984	Columbia	United States	Merriweather Post Pavilion
2 September 1984	Kiamesha Lake	United States	Concord Resort Hotel
5 September 1984	Pittsburgh	United States	Carnegie Music Hall
6 September 1984	New York City	United States	Radio City Music Hall
7 September 1984	New York City	United States	Radio City Music Hall
8 September 1984	New York City	United States	Radio City Music Hall
9 September 1984	New York City	United States	Radio City Music Hall
10 September 1984	New York City	United States	Radio City Music Hall
11 September 1984	New York City	United States	Radio City Music Hall
12 September 1984	New York City	United States	Radio City Music Hall
15 September 1984	Hartford	United States	Hartford Civic Center
17 September 1984	Atlantic City	United States	Resorts International
18 September 1984	Atlantic City	United States	Resorts International
19 September 1984	Atlantic City	United States	Resorts International
20 September 1984	Atlantic City	United States	Resorts International
21 September 1984	Atlantic City	United States	Resorts International
22 September 1984	Atlantic City	United States	Resorts International
23 September 1984	Atlantic City	United States	Resorts International
27 September 1984	Costa Mesa	United States	Pacific Amphitheatre
28 September 1984	Costa Mesa	United States	Pacific Amphitheatre
29 September 1984	Costa Mesa	United States	Pacific Amphitheatre
Europe
4 October 1984	Hamburg	West Germany	
7 October 1984	Vienna	Austria	Wiener Stadthalle
October 1984	Copenhagen	Denmark	
11 October 1984	Stockholm	Sweden	
12 October 1984	Cologne	West Germany	Sporthalle
13 October 1984	Antwerp	Belgium	Sportpaleis
14 October 1984	Ostend	Belgium	Kursaal
15 October 1984	Ghent	Belgium	Kuipke
16 October 1984	Amsterdam	Netherlands	Jaap Edenhal
18 October 1984	Zürich	Switzerland	Hallenstadion
Oceania
6 November 1984	Sydney	Australia	Entertainment Centre
7 November 1984	Sydney	Australia	Entertainment Centre
8 November 1984	Sydney	Australia	Entertainment Centre
10 November 1984	Melbourne	Australia	Sports and Entertainment Centre
11 November 1984	Melbourne	Australia	Sports and Entertainment Centre
12 November 1984	Melbourne	Australia	Sports and Entertainment Centre
13 November 1984	Melbourne	Australia	Sports and Entertainment Centre
North America
21 December 1984	New York City	United States	Avery Fisher Hall
29 December 1984	Honolulu	United States	Neal S. Blaisdell Arena
30 December 1984	Honolulu	United States	Neal S. Blaisdell Arena
31 December 1984	Honolulu	United States	Sheraton Waikiki Hotel
Europe
9 January 1985	Paris	France	Grand Rex
10 January 1985	Paris	France	Grand Rex
11 January 1985	Paris	France	Grand Rex
12 January 1985	Paris	France	Grand Rex
13 January 1985	Paris	France	Grand Rex
14 January 1985	Paris	France	Grand Rex
15 January 1985	Paris	France	Grand Rex
16 January 1985	Paris	France	Grand Rex
17 January 1985	Paris	France	Grand Rex
18 January 1985	Paris	France	Grand Rex
19 January 1985	Paris	France	Grand Rex
20 January 1985	Paris	France	Grand Rex
21 January 1985	Paris	France	Grand Rex
22 January 1985	Paris	France	Grand Rex
23 January 1985	Paris	France	Grand Rex
24 January 1985	Paris	France	Grand Rex
25 January 1985	Paris	France	Grand Rex
26 January 1985	Paris	France	Grand Rex
27 January 1985	Paris	France	Grand Rex

=== Box office score data ===
Venue	City	Tickets sold / available	Gross revenue
Roberto Clemente Coliseum	San Juan	8,703 / 8,703	$272,777
Red Rocks Amphitheatre	Denver	8,449 / 8,449	$138,444
The Summit	Houston	10,714 / 12,604	$187,209
Convention Center	Dallas	7,156 / 9,816	$123,200
Universal Amphitheatre	Los Angeles	62,510 / 62,510	$1,700,000
CNE Grandstand	Toronto	19,423 / 19,423	$318,676
Minnesota State Fair	St. Paul	14,525 / 22,000	$97,500
Hartford Civic Center	Hartford	12,720 / 13,614	$251,670
	Total	144,200 / 157,119	$3,089,476

== Cancelled shows ==
List of cancelled concerts, showing date, city, country, venue, and reason for cancellation
Date	City	Country	Venue	Reason
20 October 1984	Frankfurt	West Germany	Jahrhunderthalle	Illness
21 October 1984	Cologne	West Germany	Sporthalle	Illness
