= Newburgh Mall =

Coordinates: 41.517527°N 74.071016°W

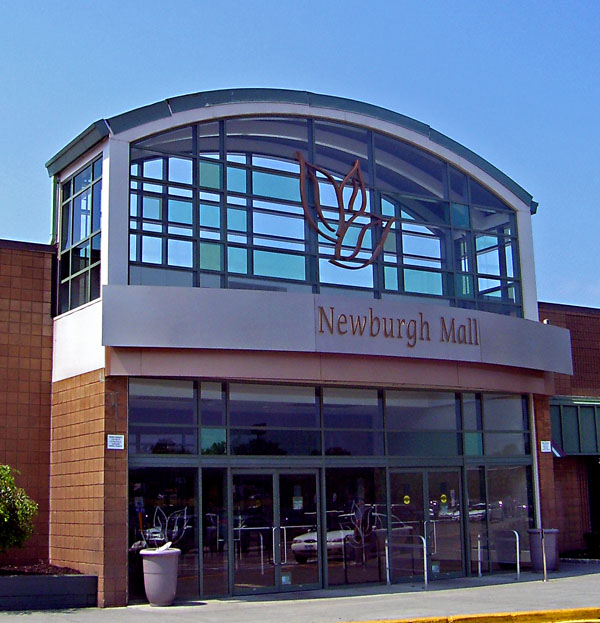
- Main entrance to the Newburgh Mall
- Location: Newburgh, New York, United States
- Opened: 1980
- Developer: The Kravco Company
- Owner: Newburgh Mall Ventures LLC
- Num. of stores: 46
- Num. of anchor tenants: 3
- Floor area: 386,075 sq ft (35,868 m^{2})
- Floors: 1
- Website: newburghmall.com

Newburgh Mall is a regional shopping center located on NY 300 in the Town of Newburgh, New York, near where Interstate 87 (the New York State Thruway) intersects with Interstate 84. It was opened in 1980 by Kravco property management (later Kravco Simon), which owns King of Prussia Mall outside Philadelphia. The mall has 46 stores, with anchor stores that are Resorts World Hudson Valley, O’Reilly Auto Parts, and Office Depot. Original anchors included the now defunct chains Caldor and Howland's (later Steinbach, then Old Navy, now TRACK23).

Old Navy relocated out of the mall in 2011. More than 25 percent vacant since 2009, the mall faced foreclosure in 2012. After operating in foreclosure for several years, the mall was sold at a foreclosure sale for $10 to the holder of its mortgage, Wells Fargo.

In 2017 the mall was sold for $7.7 million.

On August 29, 2022 it was announced that Sears would be closing in fall of 2022 marking the end of era after 43 years as the last original anchor store in the mall as well as the last Sears department store in New York The closing date for this store was announced two days later on August 31, 2022 in a Facebook post with the final day of operation being October 16, 2022.

On December 28, 2022, after 50 million dollars in renovations, the Malaysian-based Genting Group Resorts World Hudson Valley Casino, occupying 60,000 sq ft (5,600 m^{2}), featuring over 1,200 slot machines and video lottery terminals (only the ninth official video lottery facility in New York State), and electronic 82 table games, opened in the Newburgh Mall at the site of the former The Bon-Ton Department Stores in the Newburgh Mall. The arrangement also includes a $3 million annual payment by the Genting Group to the Town of Newburgh for the rights to host the casino in the town, which includes an annual $500,000 payment to Newburgh enhance police, fire and ambulance services, according to the 'Times Herald-Record' newspaper. The video lottery terminals were previously operated by the Genting Group at Monticello Raceway as a racino. The track remains open, but racino was later closed when the Genting Group opened Resorts World Catskills Casino in Monticello, New York. Office Depot closed on January 31, 2024.

In late 2023, O’Reilly Auto Parts announced that they would be opening an auto store inside the former Sears. Construction on O’Reilly Auto Parts began in late 2023 and the store was finished and open by 2024.
