= WVOS =

WVOS may refer to:

- WVOS (AM), a radio station (1240 AM) licensed to Liberty, New York, United States
- WVOS-FM, a radio station (95.9 FM) licensed to Liberty, New York, United States
