= Resorts World Hudson Valley =

Casino hotel in Monticello, New York

- Interactive map of Resorts World Hudson Valley
- Location: Newburgh, New York, US; 1401 NY-300; 41°31′9″N 74°4′18″W
- Opened: December 28, 2022; 3 years ago
- Gaming space: 60,000 sq ft (5,600 m^{2})
- Casino type: Land-based
- Owner: Empire Resorts
- Architect: JCJ Architecture
- Renovated in: The Bon-Ton Department Store at Newburgh Mall
- Website: rwhudsonvalleyny.com

Resorts World Hudson Valley is a shopping mall casino in the Newburgh Mall in Newburgh, New York.

== History ==
In the spring of 2022, New York State Governor Kathy Hochul signed off on a budget bill to authorize three downstate casino licenses, allowing retail casino gaming to set up shop in and around New York City. Six months later, the New York State Gaming Commission finalized the roster for the Gaming Facility Location Board, which will ultimately approves and assign licenses to interested parties. Genting Group applied and was approved for a license for Newburgh.

Upon the awarding of casino licenses in downstate New York, including New York City, Resorts World Hudson Valley and other upstate New York casinos could see a significant decrease in revenue. A 2025 study concluded that three downstate New York casinos could cause a 76% drop in gaming revenue for upstate New York casinos including Resorts World Hudson Valley. Genting Malaysia Berhad, which operates Resorts World Hudson Valley, bid for a full casino license at Resorts World New York City. On December 15, 2025, the New York State Gaming Commission approved Genting's expansion bid, along with the new developments Hard Rock Metropolitan Park and Bally's Ferry Point.

== Opening ==
On December 28, 2022, after 50 million dollars in renovations, Resorts World Hudson Valley Casino opened in the Newburgh Mall at the site of the former Bon-Ton department store. The casino occupies 50 thousand square feet, and features over 1200 slot machines and video lottery terminals (only the ninth official video lottery facility in New York State) and 82 electronic table games. In addition, the casino operates a special exclusive VIP Club for verified Newburgh residents only.

The video lottery terminals were previously operated by the Genting Group at Monticello Raceway as a racino. The track remains open, but the racino was later closed when the Genting Group opened the nearby Resorts World Catskills Casino in Monticello, New York.

Resorts World Hudson Valley is Genting’s third entertainment destination in New York, joining Resorts World Catskills in Monticello and Resorts World New York City in Queens. Across its three properties, Genting has invested more than $1.2 billion in New York State infrastructure across its three casino properties.
