= Mohawk Civil War =

1989–1990 conflict over reservation gambling

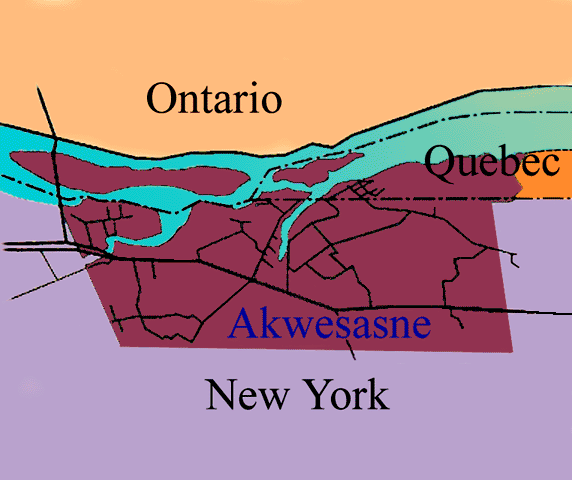
Map of Akwesasne territory

The Mohawk Civil War, also known as the Casino War, was a violent internal conflict in the Mohawk Nation territory of Akwesasne that lasted from late 1989 through mid-1990. The war centered on a bitter divide over the introduction and expansion of unregulated casino gambling on the reservation, which straddles the Canada–United States border along the St. Lawrence River in northern New York State, eastern Ontario, and southern Quebec.

The conflict pitted pro-gambling factions, largely backed by the Mohawk Warrior Society, against anti-gambling residents, traditionalists, and supporters of the elected tribal councils grouped under the label "Antis". It featured armed roadblocks, automatic weapons fire, arson, vehicle rammings, and grenade attacks. The violence peaked in spring 1990, culminating in the deaths of two Mohawks on 1 May 1990, forcing thousands of residents to flee and requiring intervention from multiple jurisdictions.

The civil war would be followed by the Oka Crisis later in the summer of the same year.

== Background ==
Akwesasne territory was historically a prosperous Mohawk community based on fishing, farming, guiding, and cross-border trade. Post-World War II industrialization—especially the 1950s construction of the St. Lawrence Seaway and nearby aluminum smelteries and foundries—heavily polluted the St. Lawrence River and surrounding lands with PCBs and heavy metals, destroying traditional fisheries and much of the natural economy.

By the 1980s, many residents turned to high-profit cigarette and liquor smuggling across the undefended international border that bisects the reserve. In the mid-1980s, several independent high-stakes casinos and bingo halls opened on the U.S. side of the territory, quickly generating tens of millions of dollars annually in unregulated revenue.

Pro-gambling advocates viewed the casinos as an exercise of sovereign rights and the only viable economic development available after industrial contamination. Opponents, including many traditional Longhouse members concerned about social impacts, saw gambling as morally corrosive, attracting organized crime and undermining Mohawk culture.

The Mohawk Warrior Society, which had evolved from border-protection and anti-smuggling patrols in the 1970s, increasingly provided security for casino owners and became the armed enforcers for the pro-gambling side.

== Course of the conflict ==
In July 1989, more than 200 FBI and New York State Police attempted to raid several casinos. This prompted the Warriors to blockade the entrances of the reserves, causing New York police to pull back in order to avoid a bloody confrontation. This left the Warriors in control of the American side of Akwesasne.

Violence intensified in early 1990. On March 23, 1990, anti-gambling residents erected roadblocks on Route 37 (the main road through the U.S. portion) to prevent gamblers from reaching the casinos.

Pro-gambling Warriors responded by attacking the barricades with assault rifles and ramming vehicles. By late April the reservation was described as a "virtual war zone" with nightly automatic weapons fire, houses shot up, and cars burned vehicles. An estimated 2,000 to 4,000 residents fled Akwesasne to nearby cities during the height of the fighting in April 1990.

On the night of 30 April into 1 May 1990, a prolonged firefight erupted. Harold "Junior" Edwards (age 31) and Matthew Pyke (age 21), from the pro and the anti side respectively, were killed. The deaths prompted immediate deployment of hundreds of police officers from the New York State Police, the Royal Canadian Mounted Police, the Ontario Provincial Police, and the Sûreté du Québec. The Canadian Forces also deployed 248 personnel to Akwesasne.

== Aftermath ==
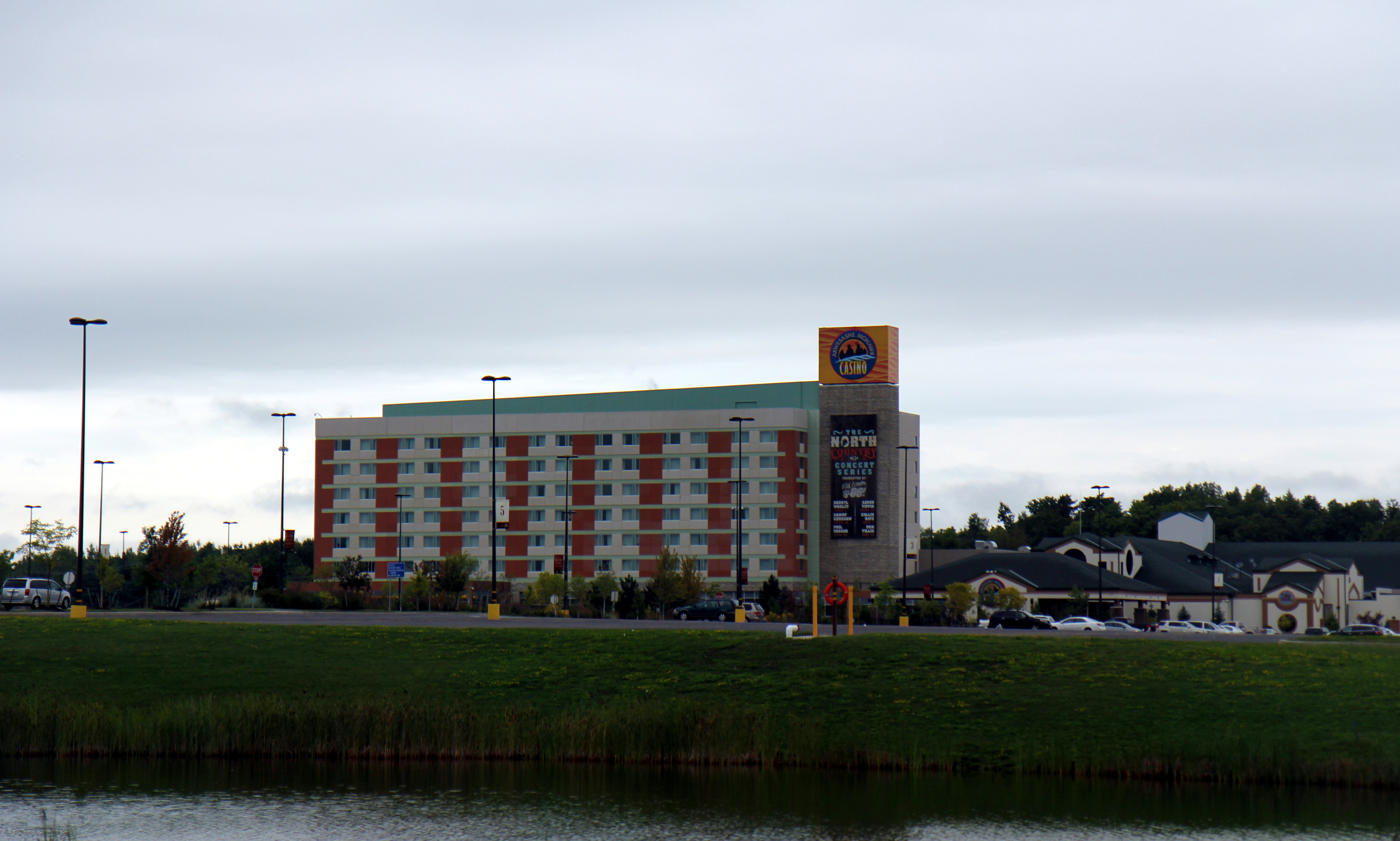
The Akwesasne Mohawk Casino, opened in 1999

After the May killings, the Canadian Forces and police maintained a heavy presence in Akwesasne for months. This presence encouraged the Warriors to leave Akwesasne for Oka, Quebec where a land dispute was brewing between the Mohawks and the municipality, who planned to develop an indigenous burial ground into a golf course. This would develop into the Oka Crisis in July–September 1990.

Gambling operations in New York State eventually became regulated under the 1993 tribal-state compact that created the Akwesasne Mohawk Casino in 1999.

== See also ==
- List of incidents of civil unrest in Canada
