= Monticello Central School District =

School district in the U.S. state of New York

Address
- 60 Jefferson Street Monticello, New York, 12701; United States

District information
- Type: Public
- Grades: K–12
- NCES District ID: 3619740

Students and staff
- Students: 2,910
- Teachers: 267.99
- Staff: 352.42
- Student–teacher ratio: 10.86

Other information
- Website: monticelloschools.net

Monticello Central School District (MCSD) is a school district headquartered in Monticello, New York.

== Schools ==
Secondary:

- Monticello High School
- Robert J. Kaiser Middle School

Primary:

- Emma C. Chase Elementary School
- George L. Cooke Elementary School
- Kenneth L. Rutherford Elementary School

Preschool:

- Project Excel Preschool
