= Elisabeth Worth Muller =

American suffragist

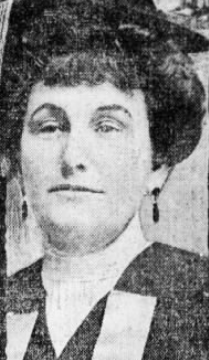
- Elisabeth Worth Muller, from a 1914 newspaper.
- Born: Elisabeth Worth; April 21, 1862; New York
- Died: February 26, 1952
- Other names: Elizabeth Worth Muller
- Occupation: Suffragist

Elisabeth Worth Muller (April 21, 1862 – February 26, 1952) was an American suffragist.

== Early life ==
Elisabeth Worth was born in New York. Senator Jacob Worth was an uncle or cousin. She graduated from New York University with a law degree.

== Career ==
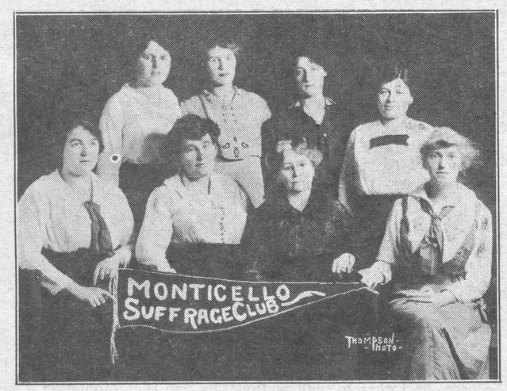
The Monticello Suffrage Club, founded by Elisabeth Worth Muller, from a 1916 publication.

Muller was the first woman to pass the bar in Sullivan County, New York, and the first woman to hold a hunting license in the county. She was founder and president of the Monticello Suffrage Club, campaigning on horseback at the area's summer resorts. In 1914 she used an oxcart to carry the club from place to place, as they set up camps to draw attention to their cause. She was arrested as part of a suffrage picket at the White House. In 1919 and 1923, she ran for a seat in the New York State Assembly. She supported eugenic marriage reform laws.

After suffrage was won, Muller continued her involvement in politics, endorsing Charles Curtis for vice president in 1928. She was chair of the Sullivan County branch of the National Woman's Party, and active in Pathfinders of America, and the Americanization Committee of the Veterans of Foreign Wars. In 1931 and 1932, she traveled to Europe, did a series of radio broadcasts from Paris, and met with Kaiser Wilhelm, Adolf Hitler, Benito Mussolini, Pope Pius XI, and Lady Astor. She was impressed with Hitler, and reported, "I am sure he will succeed." She traveled the United States to organize "Steuben Clubs" of German-Americans in the 1920s and 1930s.

== Personal life and legacy ==
Worth married Rudolph Jacob Muller, a real estate tycoon. They had two daughters, Alma and Phyllis (also known as Philipina), and lived in a large house nicknamed "Muller's Castle", near Monticello, New York. She was widowed in 1926, and moved to California to be near her daughter Alma, whose husband was actor Frank Morgan (the Wizard in The Wizard of Oz). She died in 1952, aged 89.

The Sullivan County Democratic Committee presents an annual Elizabeth Worth Muller Award to an outstanding woman in the county.
