= Empire Resorts =

Gambling company

- Type: Public
- Industry: Gaming
- Genre: Gaming holding company
- Founded: 2003; 23 years ago
- Headquarters: Monticello, New York, United States
- Owner: Kien Huat Realty (51%); Genting Malaysia (49%)
- Website: empireresorts.com

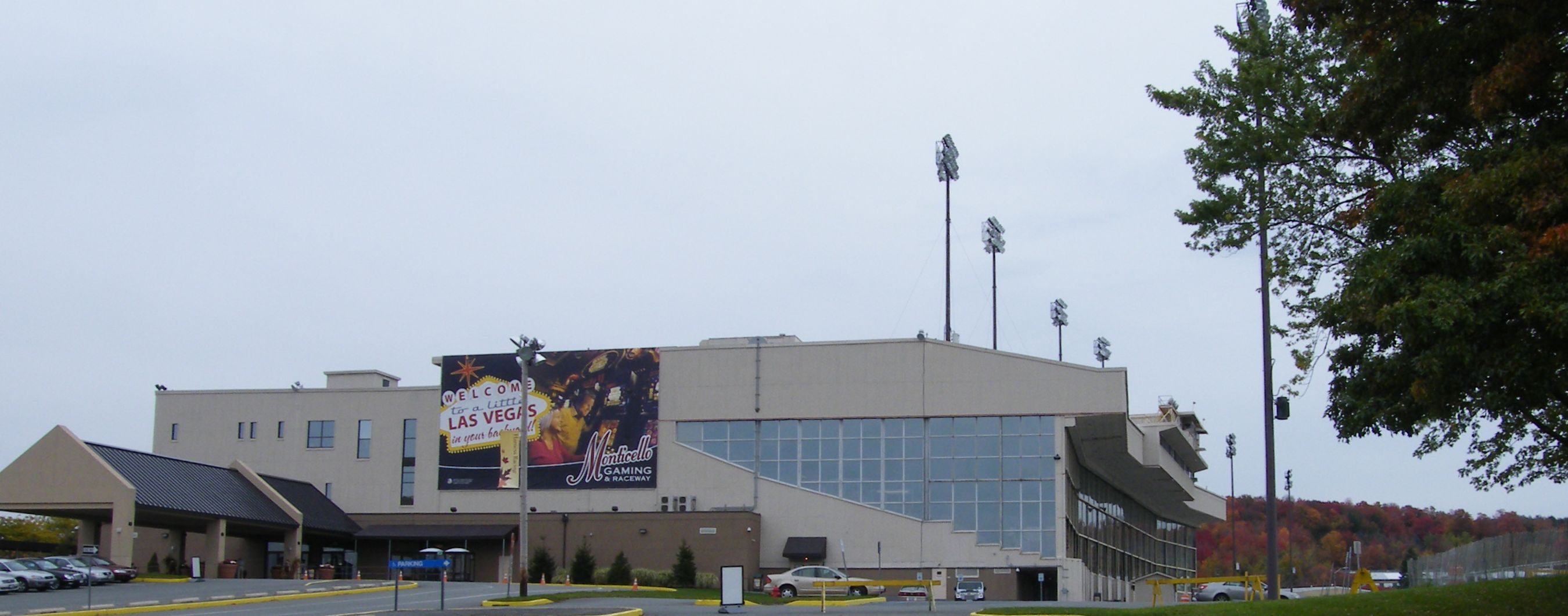
Monticello Raceway

Empire Resorts is a gaming company that owns and operates Resorts World Catskills and Monticello Raceway in the Catskill Mountains, 90 miles (140 km) from New York City. Headquartered in Monticello, New York, Empire Resorts is owned by affiliates of the Genting Group (with a 51% stake held by Kien Huat Realty and 49% by Genting Malaysia).

== History ==
Empire Resorts was founded in 2003 through a consolidation of Alpha Hospitality and Catskill Development LLC, a company that had purchased the Monticello Raceway in 1996. The consolidation was carried out by Robert A. Berman, who in the previous year had been offered control as CEO of Alpha Hospitality by Stanley Tollman.

In 2003, Berman restructured Alpha Hospitality after principal shareholders of the Bryanston Group (Alpha Hopitality's controlling shareholder) were indicted on tax-related charges. Berman restored financial stability by selling off non-essential gaming assets and merging the company with Catskill Development LLC, which led to the creation of Empire Resorts that same year. During this time Berman also arranged for Empire Resorts to sell common stock through Jefferies Group. This resulted in Empire Resorts receiving over $35 million in new funding.

In 2003 Empire Resorts became a NASDAQ Global Market company, trading under the ticker symbol "NYNY." In 2004 Empire Resorts entered into an agreement to purchase the Concord Resort Hotel from Louis R. Cappelli. The transaction was later modified by Kien Huat Realty, which gave way to the $1.5 billion resort project currently financed and under construction by Empire Resorts. The project is located on the site of Adelaar, a resort developed by Entertainment Properties Trust within the Concord Resort Hotel. The entertainment complex will include an 80,000 sq. ft. casino, multiple hotel properties, waterparks, and a retail village, dining and entertainment areas. The project is expected to be concluded by 2018.

In 2009, Kien Huat Realty invested a further $55 million in new equity capital, which represented just below 50% of the voting power of Empire Resorts. Kien Huat is an investment branch of the Genting Group, a large leisure and gambling conglomerate founded by Malaysian entrepreneur Lim Goh Tong. Kien Huat, which had previously financed the startup of Foxwoods Resort Casino and the Seneca Niagara Casino & Hotel in New York, was fronted by CEO Lim Kok Thay (Lim Goh Tong's son).

In 2010 the Genting Group won a bid to build a racino similar to what it owned in Monticello at Aqueduct Racetrack in New York City. In December 2015, Empire Resorts received a full gaming license for Montreign Resort Casino in New York. In February 2016, Kien Huat Realty purchased $290 million worth of shares, giving the firm 88.7% ownership of Empire Resorts.

Empire Resorts currently owns and manages several subsidiaries in the hospitality and gaming industries. The company owns and operates Monticello Raceway and casino in New York through its subsidiary, Monticello Raceway Management, Inc. The 230-acre (93 ha) property is located approximately 90 miles northwest of New York City. The complex offers over 1,110 VGMs, with over 40 electronic table game positions, over 1,000 video lottery terminal slot machines, electronic table games, and one of the largest all-weather harness horse racing tracks in the nation.

On January 23, 2019, Empire announced that it would close Monticello Casino's VGM operations “on or about April 23,” 2019. Empire CEO Ryan Eller said the closure was intended to “improve revenue performance at our nearby Resorts World Catskills property.” Monticello's racing operations will remain open.

In November 2019, Kien Huat Realty and Genting Malaysia took Empire Resorts private, buying all outstanding shares. The transaction left Kien Huat with a 51% stake in the company and Genting Malaysia with 49%.
