= WVOS-FM =

- Liberty, New York; United States
- Broadcast area: Monticello, New York
- Frequency: 95.9 MHz
- Branding: 95.9 VOS-FM

Programming
- Format: Classic hits
- Affiliations: ABC News Radio; Compass Media Networks

Ownership
- Owner: Vince Benedetto; (Bold Gold Media Group, L.P.)

History
- First air date: December 1964
- Former call signs: WVOS (1964–1979)
- Call sign meaning: Voice Of Sullivan (Sullivan County)

Technical information
- Licensing authority: FCC
- Facility ID: 43970
- Class: A
- ERP: 6,000 watts
- HAAT: 100 meters (330 ft)
- Transmitter coordinates: 41°45′9″N 74°43′1″W

Links
- Public license information: Public file; LMS
- Webcast: Listen Live
- Website: wvosfm.com

WVOS-FM (95.9 MHz) is a radio station broadcasting a classic hits format. Licensed to Liberty, New York, United States, the station is owned by Vince Benedetto, through licensee Bold Gold Media Group, L.P. It features programming from ABC News Radio and Compass Media Networks.

== History ==
The station went on the air as WVOS on January 12, 1967. On May 29, 1979, the station changed its call sign to the current WVOS-FM. Through various ownership changes, the station in a simulcast with sister WVOS AM started as a "middle of the road" format, playing standards mixed in with light adult contemporary titles.

In 1990, under owner Gene Blabey, the simulcast stations switched to a country format to better compete against market rival WSUL. After a nine-year run as a country station, the stations became affiliates of Waitt Radio's "hot adult contemporary" format.

Watermark Communications, having purchased WSUL in 2005, bought the simulcast later that year. The stations were rebranded as country once again, and under the moniker "Country 95.9" they quickly rebuilt an audience that had been absent for decades.

On October 31, 2007, finding an over-abundance of country formatted stations in the market, the stations flipped formats (and split up the simulcast for the first time). WVOS AM became Spanish-language ESPN deportes and WVOS-FM became classic hits "VOS-FM" and now brands itself as "The Greatest Hits of All Time". The station was home to the longest running program in Catskills radio history, the "Bop Shop" hosted by John Manzi, which ended in September 2021 after nearly 40 years.

According to the spring 2011 Arbitron ratings, VOS-FM is Sullivan County's most listened to radio station.

Effective November 30, 2016, Watermark Communications sold WVOS-FM, along with sister stations WSUL and WVOS, to Bold Gold Media Group, L.P. for $1.6 million.

The station can also be heard online at wvosfm.com, TuneIn Radio, Amazon Alexa Skill, RadioBold App, iOS, Android and GoogePlay platforms.
