= Monticello High School (New York) =

Coordinates: 41.6443°N 74.7012°W

- 39 Breakey Avenue; Monticello, New York 12701

Information
- Type: Public High School
- School district: Monticello Central School District
- Principal: Jennifer Gorr
- Faculty: 79
- Grades: 9 - 12
- Enrollment: 848 (2023-2024)
- Student to teacher ratio: 11:1
- Color
- Team name: Panthers
- Website: School website

Monticello High School is a four-year public high school in Monticello, New York.

According to state test scores, 93% of students are at least proficient in math and 92% in reading.

== Notable alumni ==
- Stephanie Blythe, opera singer
- Lawrence H. Cooke, Chief Judges of the New York Court of Appeals
- Judith Kaye, first woman to serve as Chief Judge of the New York State Court System
- Robert S. Kapito (born 1957), co-founder and president of BlackRock
- Danielle Johnson, electronic musician
- Gene D. Block, Chancellor of UCLA.
- Christopher Schnabel, Senior Content Manager for the Houston Texans
