= Akwesasne Mohawk Casino =

Gambling venue in upstate New York

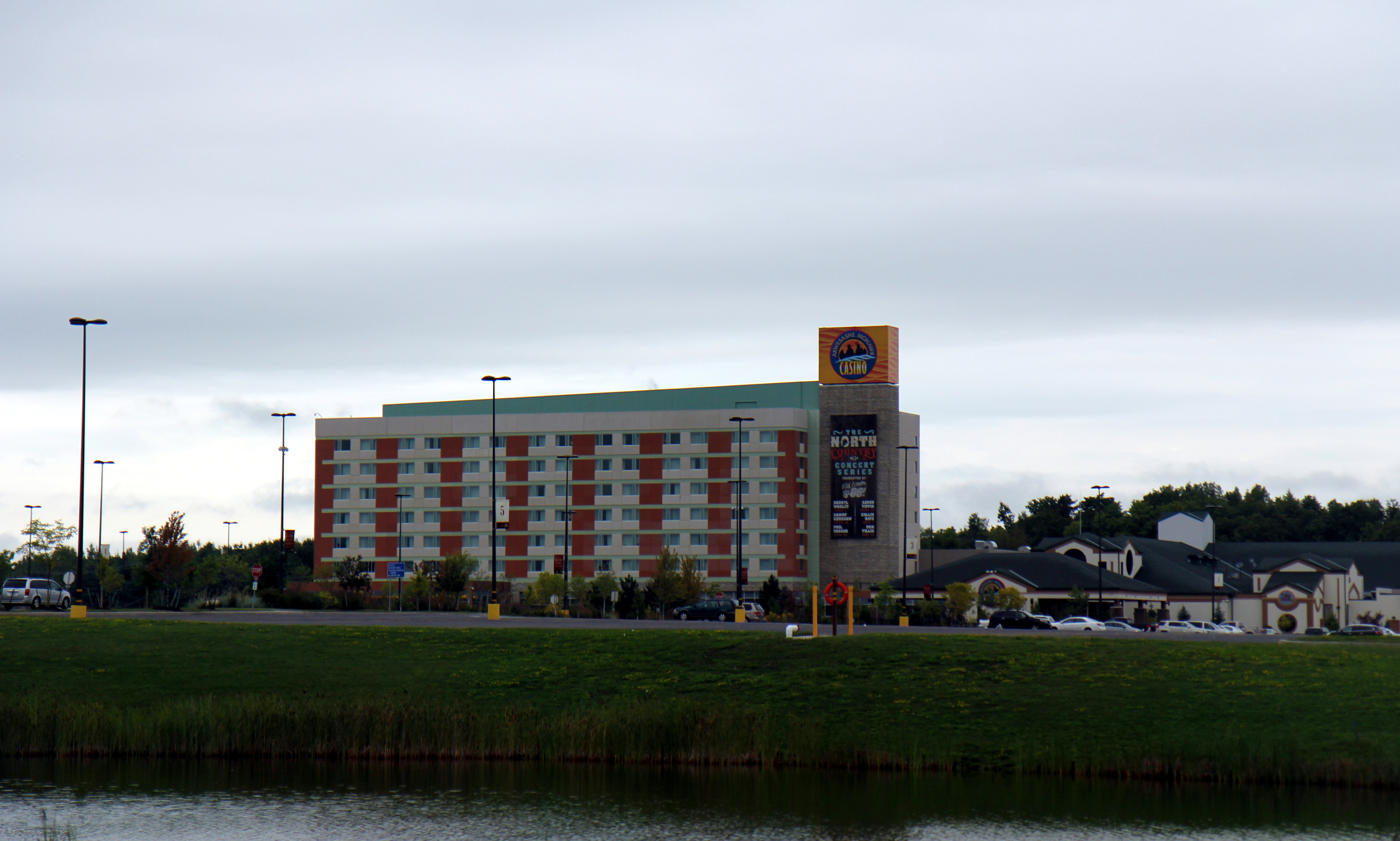
- The casino in 2014
- Interactive map of Akwesasne Mohawk Casino Resort
- Location: Hogansburg, New York; 873 New York State Route 37, Hogansburg, New York, United States; 44°58′14.5″N 74°38′29″W
- Theme: Native American
- Gaming space: 140,000 square feet (13,000 m^{2})
- Notable restaurants: Native Harvest Buffet; Maple Room Steakhouse; Rapids Food Court; Sticks Sports Bar and Grill; Cascades Lounge
- Casino type: Native American gambling enterprise
- Owner: Mohawk nation
- Renovated in: 2011, 2012
- Website: http://www.mohawkcasino.com

The Akwesasne Mohawk Casino (AMC) is a Native American gambling enterprise run by the Saint Regis Mohawk Tribe in Akwesasne, New York. It has 140,000 square feet (13,000 m^{2}) for 1,800+ slot machines and 30 table games. The casino is located within the boundaries of the Akwesasne Mohawk reservation as defined in the 1796 Treaty with the Seven Nations of Canada.

== Facilities ==
The casino is a casino resort with hotel, spas, diner and lounge. This resort provides 150 rooms and luxury suites. Spas are located on the second floor. Cascade Lounge offers drink and entertainment within the casino. The resort also has shows of live music, comedy and sport events.

The casino has 30 table games which includes Blackjack, Caribbean Stud Poker, Mississippi Stud, Let It Ride!, Pai Gow Poker, Roulette and Craps. It also has bingo in their Mohawk Bingo Palace everyday throughout the week. Bingo starts every Saturday night at 10:30 with theme night costume contest for cash drawings. Within the Mohawk Bingo Palace there is a poker room. There are also more than 1,800 slot machines.

== Expansion ==
The Akwesasne Mohawk Casino was opened on April 12, 1999. It has grown into one of the largest entertainment destinations in the North Country. In 2011 the casino invested $74 million to expand. On May 9, 2013, the casino completed an expansion that included a 7-story hotel with 150 rooms, heated indoor pool, Jacuzzi, fitness center, spas and restaurants.

== Employment awards ==
Every year the committee would review the nominations and select the winner of manager of the year by voting. Each winner received a $1,000 gift card and a plaque of recognition. All of the nominees received a $150 gift certificate and a plaque.

== See also ==
- List of casinos in New York
- Kahnawake Gaming Commission, regulating Mohawk gambling in Canada
