= Concord Resort Hotel =

Former resort in New York, United States

Coordinates: 41.678854°N 74.654642°W

General information
- Status: Closed
- Type: Hotel
- Location: Concord Rd; Kiamesha Lake, New York United States
- Opened: 1935
- Closed: 1998; 28 years ago
- Owner: Unknown

Other information
- Number of rooms: 1,500

The Concord Resort Hotel (/ˈkɒnkɒrd/) was a resort in the Borscht Belt of the Catskills, known for its large resort industry in the 1950s, 1960s and 1970s. Located in Kiamesha Lake, New York, United States, the Concord was the largest resort in the region and was also one of the last to finally close in 1998, long after the others closed. (A primary competitor, Grossinger's Catskill Resort Hotel, closed in 1986.) At the Concord, there were over 1,500 guest rooms and a dining room that sat 3,000; the resort encompassed some 2,000 acres (809 ha). The resort was a kosher establishment, catering primarily to Jewish vacationers from the New York City area, and it was more lavish in decor and activities than comparable large Catskill resorts.

== History and design ==
Room B322 in 1977

A small establishment near Kiamesha Lake called the Ideal House existed during the 1920s and 1930s. Arthur Winarick acquired the property after a default and rebuilt it in 1937 as the 500-bed Concord Plaza. Keeping up with Grossinger's following World War II, the then-renamed New Concord Hotel rapidly expanded and added amenities to match Grossinger's ski slope and golf course. The Tropical Indoor Pool opened in 1951, accelerating the race. Expansion continued in the 1950s, when prominent hotel architect Morris Lapidus was hired to design new modern style guest wings. At the Concord, Lapidus worked with architect-interior designer Theordor Muller on interiors for lobbies, dining spaces and night clubs. A rotunda and promenade, as well as the huge Cordillion Room, Night Owl Lounge and the even bigger Imperial Room night club were added. Lapidus employed his signature floating stair design in the rotunda to give guests an opportunity to make a grand entrance.

The Concord was known for its impressive entertainment venues. The original Cordillion Room opened in the 1950s with 1500 seats, along with the Constellation Room, with its distinctive undulating bar. Winarick felt that more was needed, and the Lapidus-designed Imperial Room seated three thousand in a nearly-circular space: perhaps the largest in the Catskills, and a popular venue for major entertainers.

Guest quarters in the tower sections were regarded as impersonal. Up to ten-story guest wings replaced the original hotel in the 1950s. A Lapidus-designed 1959 wing featured 210 rooms with projecting bay windows and his-and-her bathrooms, each with a dressing area.

Following the construction of an elaborate indoor pool at Grossinger's, the original Concord pool was replaced by the Lapidus-design Bubble, which doubled as a solarium, as well as a large spa.

The Concord attracted major entertainers who could fill the Imperial Room to standing room-only. Buddy Hackett was a frequently-featured performer, as were Tony Bennett, Milton Berle and Tony Martin. Barbra Streisand and Judy Garland also played the Concord. Martin Luther King Jr. received an award at the Concord in 1963. Following Arthur Winarick's death in 1964, the resort was managed by son-in-law Ray Parker.

== Phil Greenwald ==
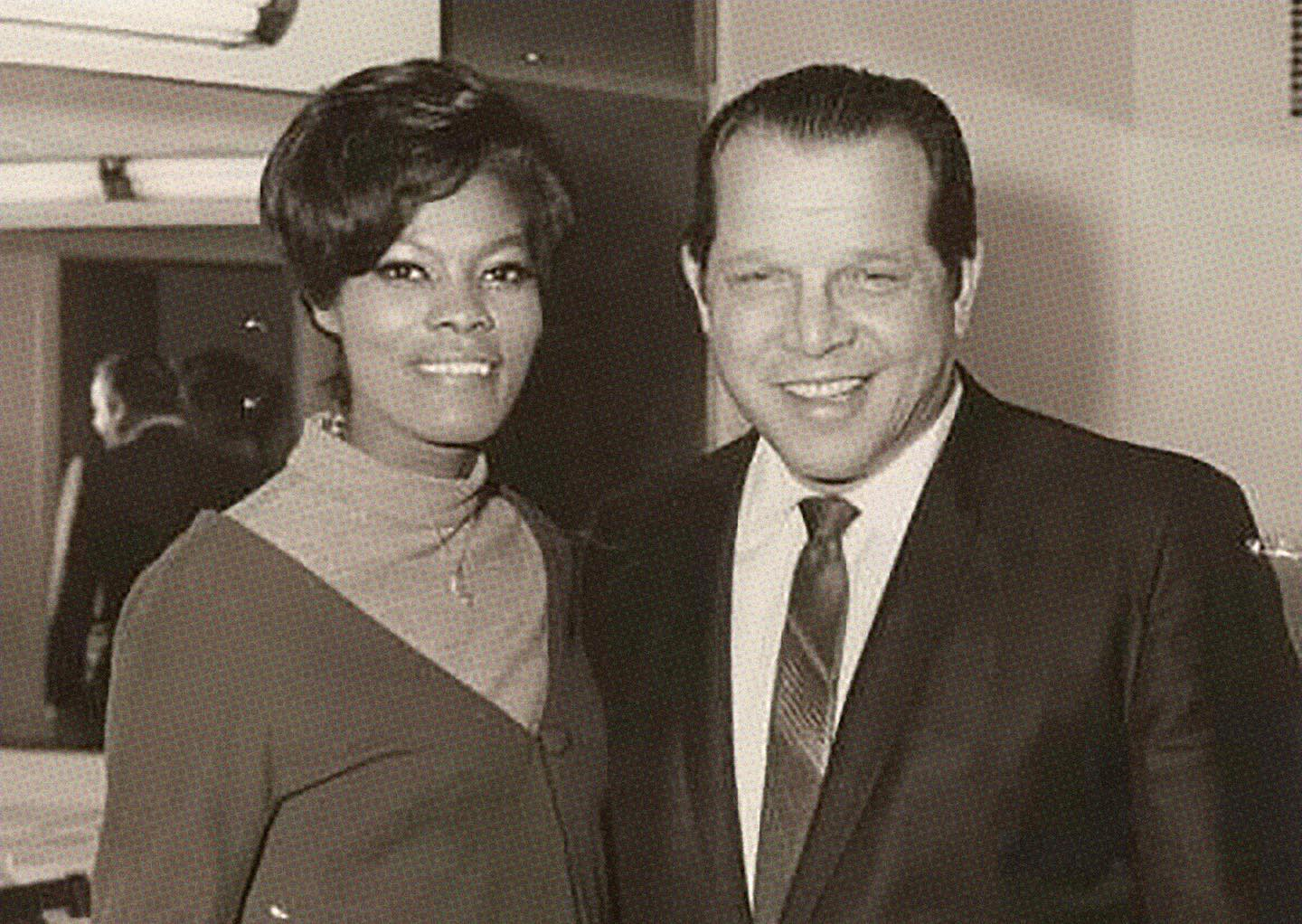
Phil Greenwald and Dionne Warwick at the Concord Hotel in the 1960s

Winarick's cousin in law Abraham Greenwald had helped Winarick and his family immigrate from Tsarist Russia, which was persecuting Jews. The two men later became business partners and opened up a barbershop in New York City, before Winarick's success in hoteling. And so on 1935, Winarick hired Phil Greenwald, Abraham's cousin. Phil can be considered one of the main contributors to the Concord's success as he eventually rose up to become the exclusive permanent talent booker for the Concord. Additionally, he became the director of Entertainment and the producer for the Concord's Imperial room. And it was his influence and ability to get many of the most famous celebrities of his time to entertain at the Concord helped add to the fame of not only the Concord, but the greater Borscht Belt and Catskill mountain area, which advanced the Jewish cultural influence in the region. His ability to attract great talent and draw in crowd's even led his friend Walter Winchell to describe Greenwald as "Phil Greenwald: Prop. of the Concord" (the propagandist of the Concord).

=== Later history ===
Secondary Concord lobby between the main building and building "D" in 1977

In 1997, the business filed for bankruptcy, leaving a debt of over $8 million in back taxes to Sullivan County. In 1999, the property sold "for $10.5 million to a partnership led by Joe Murphy, with Louis R. Cappelli as a silent partner".

In 2000, a news report stated that there was a plan to build a $500 million resort. As of 2009, the Concord Resort & Golf Club was in operation, but it later closed. It was billed as the home of the famous "Monster" Golf Course. There were 42 guest rooms attached to the golf course. The "Monster Golf Academy" was under the direction of PGA Professional Todd Barker. The former hotel portion, though, was demolished in 2008.

The Concord was used several times over the years by the New York State Association of Fire Chiefs for their annual convention and trade show. In addition, every January, the Concord was the home of the yearly "Grand Council Pulaski Association Weekend" for many years, hosting members from the NYPD Pulaski Association, the Nassau County Police Pulaski Association and the Philadelphia Police Pulaski Association.

In 2010, financial disputes between the owners led to a legal settlement, splitting property between the parties. Entertainment Properties Trust REIT won 1,500 acres (6.1 km^{2}) of the Concord site from developer Louis R. Cappelli, who retained control of 116 acres (0.47 km^{2}). Monticello Raceway owner Empire Resorts announced plans to explore development of a racino resort on the property in partnership with Entertainment Properties.

On May 5, 2011, the owners of the Mohegan Sun casino in Uncasville, Connecticut announced a competing joint venture with Cappelli Enterprises Inc. to build a $600 million racino on the site of the former hotel. According to the statement, the new resort will include a 258-room hotel, 75,000-square-foot (7,000 m^{2}) casino with 2,100 video lottery terminals, five restaurants, a harness racing facility and grandstand, and a simulcast facility for pari-mutuel wagering. In May 2017. it was announced the casino-resort, run by Empire Resorts would be called "Resorts World Catskills", and planned to open in 2018. In February 2018, Resorts World Catskills opened. The property can be seen as a filming location for the Showtime program Billions.

== Concord timeline ==
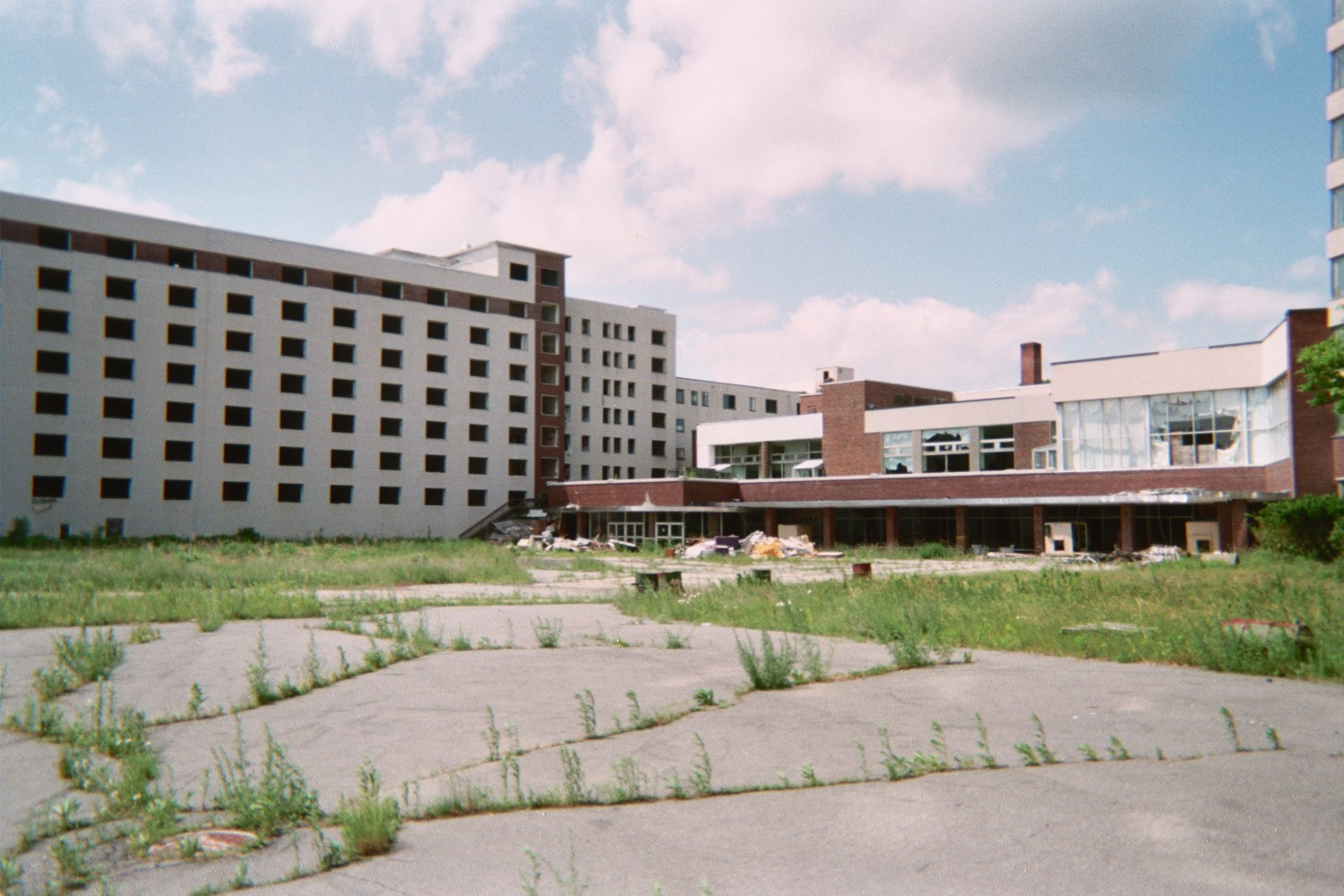
Concord remains, summer 2005

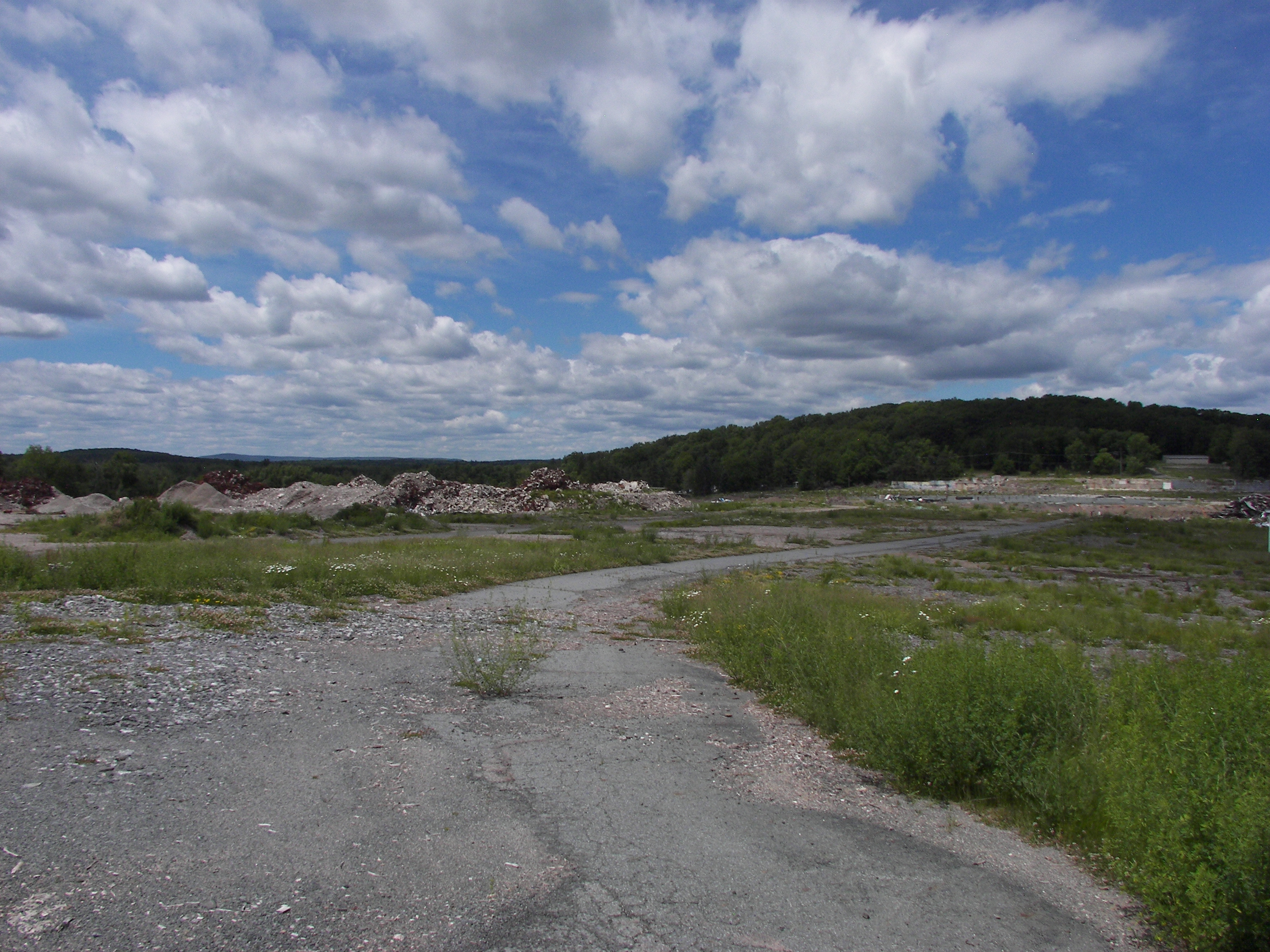
View looking up old main driveway with the demolished hotel in the background, June 2010

- 1935 – Russian immigrant Arthur Winarick took possession of The Ideal Plaza in Kiamesha Lake in settlement of a debt. This marks the beginning of what would become the Concord Resort Hotel.
- 1950s – With a reputation for sumptuous kosher dining and top entertainment, the hotel becomes one of the top vacation spots in the Northeast. Winarick's daughter, Clara, and her husband, Raymond Parker, take over the hotel operation. The hotel is passed on to Raymond's sons.
- 1960s – The decline of the Catskills resort industry takes hold, as city dwellers move out to air-conditioned homes in the suburbs, affordable air travel makes vacations to more exotic locations possible, and the Civil Rights Act of 1964 allows the Jewish clientele of the Catskills resorts to choose other, previously exclusive domestic resorts for their vacations. The hotel hosted "singles" weekends where visitors could mix in the hope of meeting a partner.
- 1981 - Professional boxing comes to the hotel; on May 16, two future boxing hall-of-famers, Hector Camacho Sr. and Ray Mancini, have bouts as part of a program held at the hotel. Camacho stops Kato Ali in round seven and Mancini, in the card's main event, stops Jorge Morales in nine rounds to win the North American Boxing Federation Lightweight title. Both Camacho and Mancini would become world champions and they would fight on March 6, 1989, Camacho outpointing Mancini. They both were inducted into the International Boxing Hall of Fame.
- January 1997 – Albany lawmakers reject a casino referendum, which Concord owners were relying on heavily.
- February 1997 – Concord files for bankruptcy protection. Sullivan County, owed more than $8 million in taxes, is the resort's largest creditor.
- January 1999 – The hotel sells at a bankruptcy foreclosure auction for $10.25 million, to a partnership led by Joseph Murphy with Westchester developer Louis R. Cappelli as a silent partner. Cappelli later buys out Murphy.
- March 2000 – Cappelli and the publicly traded Reckson Strategic Venture Partners announce a plan to redevelop the Concord as a world-class resort.
- October 10, 2000 – Cappelli and his partners break ground and begin demolition.
- December 2004 – Concord sold by Reckson Strategic Venture Partners/Cappelli, which purchased it out of bankruptcy, to Empire Resorts. Empire owns Monticello Raceway as well as Mighty M Gaming, which operates the "racino" at the Monticello Raceway. It was reported that Empire hoped to locate a casino at the Concord. Reported by Concord Hotel: What It Looked Like Inside The Hotel in 2005:
- January 2008 – Outside of the golf course, the resort remains an abandoned ruin.
- April 2008 – Demolition begins in the new Concord hotel/Racino. The $750 million project is expected to be completed in five years.
- May 2011 - Owner enters a joint venture with Mohegan Sun casino to develop a new $600 million Concord resort.
- December 2014 - The Gaming Facility Location Board of New York State chose The Montreign Resort Casino to be built in the Catskills town of Thompson on the grounds of the old Concord hotel. The $630 million project will come with an 18-story hotel, meeting spaces and an indoor waterpark. Its developer, Empire Resorts, operates through a subsidiary, the nearby Monticello Casino & Raceway.
- February 2018 - Resorts World Catskills opens on the site.
