= WSUL =

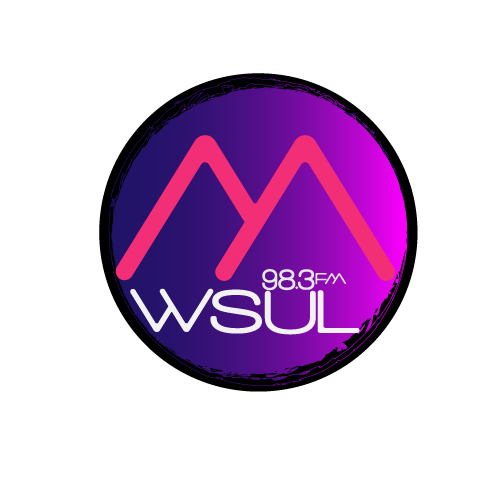
- Monticello, New York; United States
- Frequency: 98.3 MHz
- Branding: 98.3 WSUL

Programming
- Format: Adult contemporary
- Affiliations: Compass Media Networks; Premiere Networks; United Stations Radio Networks; Westwood One

Ownership
- Owner: Vince Benedetto; (Bold Gold Media Group, L.P.)

History
- First air date: April 16, 1977
- Call sign meaning: Sullivan County

Technical information
- Licensing authority: FCC
- Facility ID: 56075
- Class: A
- ERP: 2,200 watts
- HAAT: 163 meters (565 ft)
- Transmitter coordinates: 41°39′38″N 74°41′14″W

Links
- Public license information: Public file; LMS
- Webcast: Listen Live
- Website: wsul.com

WSUL (98.3 FM) is a commercial radio station broadcasting an adult contemporary radio format. Licensed to Monticello, New York, the station is currently owned by Vince Benedetto, through licensee Bold Gold Media Group, L.P.

== History ==
WSUL was owned and operated by former disc jockey Dan Dayton and his wife, Lynn (Dan Communications Inc.). Pat Gillen and Dave Driscoll anchored the morning show at one time. For ten years the station played easy listening songs from the '60s and '70s until the station was sold to Reynolds Communications. In 1988, under new Owner/General Manager Bill Reynolds, the radio station developed an Adult-Contemporary format called "Lite Rock" and proceeded to dominate the market. The "Lite Rock" moniker remained into the mid-1990s when the station evolved into a Hot AC format under the leadership of PD and morning host Josh Sommers and MD/APD and afternoon driver Ray Myers, while continuing its market dominance. In the late 1990s the station added a translator at 95.7 FM in Middletown, New York. In 2005, WSUL was sold to Watermark Broadcasting, Inc.

On October 18, 2021, WSUL changed their format from Top 40/CHR to Adult Contemporary and added Chase Daniels as Program Director and PMD Host
