= Kiamesha Lake, New York =

Kiamesha Lake
- hamlet and CDP
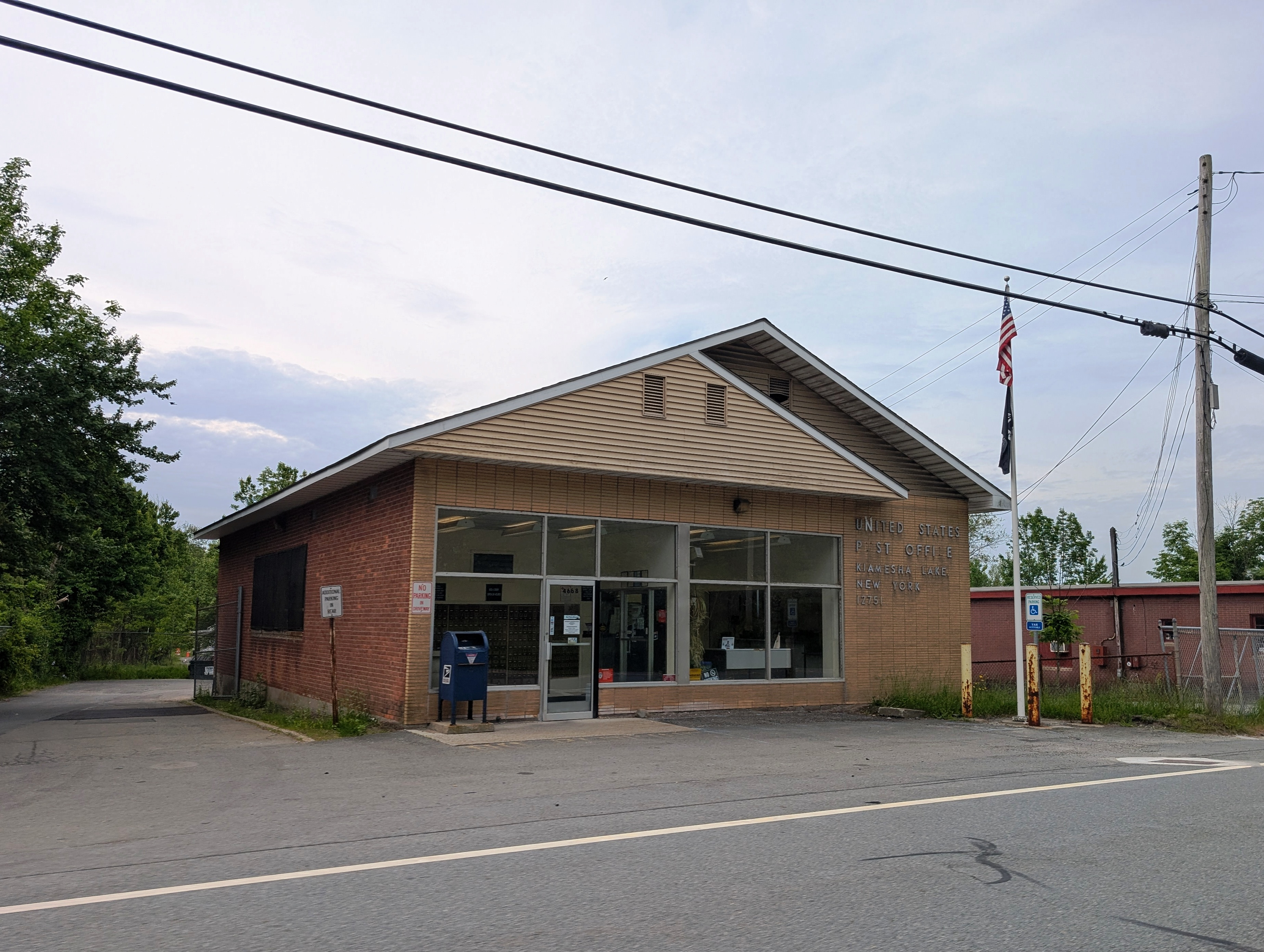
- Kiamesha Lake United States Post Office

- Location within the state of New York
- Coordinates: 41°40′59″N 74°39′39″W
- Country: United States
- State: New York
- County: Sullivan
- Time zone: UTC-5 (Eastern (EST))
  - Summer (DST): UTC-4 (EDT)
- ZIP codes: 12751
- Area code: 845
- FIPS code: 36105
- GNIS feature ID: 954584

Kiamesha Lake is a hamlet (and census-designated place) in the town of Thompson, in east-central Sullivan County, New York, United States. The zip code for Kiamesha Lake is 12751.

As of the 2020 census, Kiamesha Lake had a population of 320.

Kiamesha Lake is located on Route 42, between Monticello and Fallsburg, off New York State Route 17 (Future Interstate 86) exit 105B.

== Travel and recreation ==
Kiamesha Lake was the home to the Concord Resort & Golf Club and across the lake was the smaller family Hotel Gradus and Bungalow Colony. It is now home to several bungalow colonies and to the Resorts World Catskills hotel and casino.

== Hasidic Community ==
Kiamesha Lake is home to a year-round Hasidic community. It was originally a satellite community of the Vizhnitzer Hasidic Community of Monsey, New York, consisting of about 80 families. Since the passing of the previous Vizhnitzer Rebbe of Monsey, Grand Rabbi Mordechai Hager on March 16, 2018, his son Rabbi Menachem Mendel Hager, the Chief Rabbi of the community, ascended to the title of Rebbe of the Vizhnitzer community of Kiamesha Lake. It is also home to a Vizhnitzer Yeshiva at the site of the former Gibber's Hotel.

== Education ==
- Hebrew Day School of Sullivan and Ulster Counties.
- Vizhnitz Yeshiva (formerly Gibber Hotel)
