= Mega number =

Type of number drawn in a lottery game

A mega number, also known as a powerball, mega ball, or bonus ball, is a number drawn in a lottery game that comes from a second number field, rather than among the game's "regular" numbers.

As of 2015, forty-six U.S. lotteries offer Mega Millions and Powerball. These games each use two sets of numbers. Mega Millions draws five balls from a machine containing 70 balls. A sixth number, the "Mega Ball", then is drawn from a second drum, of 25 numbers. Powerball draws from two sets of numbers as well.

The double matrixes are chosen so that both the jackpot odds and the overall odds of winning can be controlled. In either game, all six numbers must be matched to win or share a jackpot; however, matching the number drawn from the second drum automatically wins.

The order in which the five regular numbers are drawn does not matter. A player holding a ticket with 1-2-3-4-5 in one game matches all five regular numbers if the order in which the machine selects these numbers is 5-2-4-3-1. To win a jackpot, the player must match not only the first five numbers drawn(in any order) but also match the "Mega Number" from the second machine.

Some U.S. lotteries also offer a smaller "Mega-Number" game. For example, California offers SuperLotto Plus, where the first five numbers are drawn from a set of 47 white balls; its Mega Number is drawn from a set of 27 yellow balls by a second machine.

Pennsylvania once offered a jackpot game where the order drawn did matter. Its Mix & Match required players not only to match 5 of 19 numbers, but also the order of the numbers drawn.
