= WVOS (AM) =

- Liberty, New York; United States
- Frequency: 1240 kHz
- Branding: Catskills News Talk 92.5 & 94.9

Programming
- Format: News/Talk
- Affiliations: Bloomberg Radio; Fox News Radio; Premiere Networks; Red Apple Media; Townhall News

Ownership
- Owner: Vince Benedetto; (Bold Gold Media Group, L.P.)

History
- First air date: 1947

Technical information
- Licensing authority: FCC
- Facility ID: 43980
- Class: C
- Power: 1,000 watts unlimited
- Transmitter coordinates: 41°46′54.3″N 74°43′47.6″W
- Translators: 92.5 W223DB (Liberty); 94.9 W235AW (Monticello)

Links
- Public license information: Public file; LMS
- Webcast: Listen Live
- Website: catskillsnewstalk.com

WVOS (1240 kHz) is an AM radio station broadcasting a news/talk format. Licensed to Liberty, New York, United States, the station is owned by Vince Benedetto, through licensee Bold Gold Media Group, L.P.

One of the station's biggest news scoops was on July 20, 1969, when it broke the news that the Woodstock music festival was going to be held in Bethel, New York. The news broke even as Max Yasgur and the promoters were in a White Lake restaurant negotiating the details of the site. According to Woodstock lore, restaurant employees called the station during the meeting.

In 2010, the station was rebranded as Spanish-language: 1240 ESPN Deportes.

On September 1, 2014, WVOS changed its format from ESPN Deportes to a simulcast of classic hits-formatted WVOS-FM 95.9 Liberty, NY.

On June 26, 2023, WVOS separated from its full simulcast of WVOS-FM (classic hits) and became a news/talk format with two FM translators in the market at 92.5 and 94.9 FM. The station brings over Cilibertro & Friends talk show from sister station WDNB-FM (Thunder 102).
