= Monticello, New York =

Village in Sullivan County, New York

- Village
- Village of Monticello
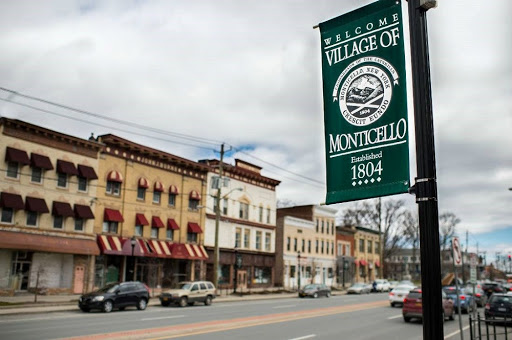
- An image of the Broadway district in Monticello
- Nicknames: Gateway to the Catskills, Crossroads of the Catskills
- Location of Monticello in Sullivan County, New York
- Coordinates: 41°39′N 74°41′W
- Country: United States
- State: New York
- County: Sullivan
- Town: Thompson
- Established: 1804
- Incorporated: 1830

Government
  - Mayor: Rochelle Massey

Area
  - Total: 4.10 sq mi (10.63 km^{2})
  - Land: 4.08 sq mi (10.57 km^{2})
  - Water: 0.023 sq mi (0.06 km^{2})
- Elevation: 1,512 ft (461 m)

Population (2020)
  - Total: 7,173
  - Estimate (2021): 7,332
  - Density: 1,757.5/sq mi (678.57/km^{2})
- Demonym: Monticellonian
- Time zone: UTC-5 (EST)
  - Summer (DST): UTC-4 (EDT)
- ZIP codes: 12701
- Area code: 845
- FIPS code: 36-48175
- GNIS feature ID: 0957561
- Website: www.villageofmonticello.com

Monticello (/ˌmɒntɪˈsɛloʊ/ MON-tiss-EL-oh) is a village located in Thompson, Sullivan County, within the Catskills region of New York, United States. It is the seat for the town of Thompson, and the county seat of Sullivan County. The population was 7,173 at the 2020 census. The village was named after the residence of Thomas Jefferson.

The village is located in the central part of Thompson, adjacent to New York Route 17 and 17B. Monticello is the largest village in the county in both population and area. It is roughly located at the half-way point between Binghamton, New York and New York City along NY 17.

== History ==
In 1801, Samuel F. Jones was given the task of finding a route for the Newburgh and Cochecton Turnpike to connect The Hudson and Delaware Rivers. While he marked the path through what was then Orange and Ulster counties he saw an opportunity to build a village on the turnpike. Samuel convinced his younger brother, John Patterson Jones, to buy a 1861-acre tract of land that would be bisected by the turnpike so they could build this new village. In 1803, John and 11 other men started work on a sawmill, and other infrastructure to help them build the village. The group left the area during the winter but would return in the early months of 1804 to continue their work. In spring of the same year the route for the turnpike was finalized and the two brothers started to plan the village. After the plan was completed, the first tree was chopped down by John September 4, 1804, on the property that would later become his house. The village grew from there, having 20 houses by 1813 and being officially incorporated on April 20, 1830.

=== 1909 fire ===
On the evening of August 10, 1909, a major fire started in the Broadway district of Monticello. The fire started in a local power station and quickly spread from building to building, engulfing the whole of Broadway street in flames. Local fire departments were scrambled to stop the fire, quickly containing the fire and stopping its spread to residential areas. By the time the dust had settled, 40 buildings had been reduced to ash, causing roughly 1 million dollars in damages. Luckily, no one was killed in the fire and the village soon rebuilt.

== Geography ==
Monticello is located at 41°39′N 74°41′W (41.653, -74.690).

According to the United States Census Bureau, the village has a total area of 4.1 square miles (11 km^{2}), all land.

The village of Monticello is located in the southern portion of the Catskill Mountains region of Lower New York. By driving distance, Monticello is approximately 80 miles (130 km) NE of Scranton, Pennsylvania, 90 miles (140 km) southeast of Binghamton, 150 miles (240 km) southeast of Elmira, 85 miles (137 km) northwest of New York City, 150 miles (240 km) northwest of Lakewood, New Jersey, and 100 miles (160 km) southwest of Albany.

== Demographics ==
=== 2020 census ===
As of the 2020 census, Monticello had a population of 7,173. The median age was 34.7 years. 25.6% of residents were under the age of 18 and 14.4% of residents were 65 years of age or older. For every 100 females there were 93.3 males, and for every 100 females age 18 and over there were 89.0 males age 18 and over.

99.5% of residents lived in urban areas, while 0.5% lived in rural areas.

There were 2,876 households in Monticello, of which 31.7% had children under the age of 18 living in them. Of all households, 24.6% were married-couple households, 24.8% were households with a male householder and no spouse or partner present, and 40.6% were households with a female householder and no spouse or partner present. About 38.9% of all households were made up of individuals and 15.4% had someone living alone who was 65 years of age or older.

There were 3,705 housing units, of which 22.4% were vacant. The homeowner vacancy rate was 7.3% and the rental vacancy rate was 10.3%.

Racial composition as of the 2020 census
| Race | Number | Percent |
|---|---|---|
| White | 2,704 | 37.7% |
| Black or African American | 2,189 | 30.5% |
| American Indian and Alaska Native | 47 | 0.7% |
| Asian | 287 | 4.0% |
| Native Hawaiian and Other Pacific Islander | 4 | 0.1% |
| Some other race | 1,071 | 14.9% |
| Two or more races | 871 | 12.1% |
| Hispanic or Latino (of any race) | 2,143 | 29.9% |

=== 2000 census ===
As of the census of 2000, there were 6,512 people, 2,554 households, and 1,460 families residing in the village. The population density was 1,601.5 inhabitants per square mile (618.3/km^{2}). There were 3,758 housing units at an average density of 924.2 per square mile (356.8/km^{2}). The racial makeup of the village was 55.57% White, 29.32% African American, 0.31% Native American, 2.13% Asian, 0.05% Pacific Islander, 8.14% from other races, and 4.48% from two or more races. Hispanic or Latino of any race were 23.16% of the population.

There were 2,554 households, out of which 31.7% had children under the age of 18 living with them, 29.9% were married couples living together, 21.8% had a female householder with no husband present, and 42.8% were non-families. 36.1% of all households were made up of individuals, and 13.7% had someone living alone who was 65 years of age or older. The average household size was 2.39 and the average family size was 3.14.

In the village, the population was spread out, with 28.3% under the age of 18, 8.7% from 18 to 24, 27.5% from 25 to 44, 22.8% from 45 to 64, and 12.7% who were 65 years of age or older. The median age was 35 years. For every 100 females, there were 95.2 males. For every 100 females age 18 and over, there were 90.5 males.

The median income for a household in the village was $22,671, and the median income for a family was $29,554. Males had a median income of $32,623 versus $22,827 for females. The per capita income for the village was $14,433. About 30.8% of families and 35.6% of the population were below the poverty line, including 49.7% of those under age 18 and 23.7% of those age 65 or over.

== Education ==
Historical population
| Census | Pop. | Note | %± |
|---|---|---|---|
| 1870 | 912 | | — |
| 1880 | 941 | | 3.2% |
| 1890 | 1,016 | | 8.0% |
| 1900 | 1,160 | | 14.2% |
| 1910 | 1,941 | | 67.3% |
| 1920 | 2,330 | | 20.0% |
| 1930 | 3,450 | | 48.1% |
| 1940 | 3,737 | | 8.3% |
| 1950 | 4,223 | | 13.0% |
| 1960 | 5,222 | | 23.7% |
| 1970 | 5,991 | | 14.7% |
| 1980 | 6,306 | | 5.3% |
| 1990 | 6,597 | | 4.6% |
| 2000 | 6,512 | | −1.3% |
| 2010 | 6,726 | | 3.3% |
| 2020 | 7,173 | | 6.6% |
| 2021 (est.) | 7,332 | | 2.2% |
U.S. Decennial Census

The Monticello Central School District operates five schools.

- Project Excel: preschool
- George L. Cooke Elementary School: Grades K–2
- Kenneth L. Rutherford Elementary School: Grades 3–5
- Emma C. Chase Elementary School: Grades K–5
- Robert J. Kaiser Middle School: Grades 6–8
- Monticello High School: Grades 9–12

== Media ==
Monticello is home to the radio station WSUL 98.3 FM that features Adult Contemporary music and is Sullivan County's most popular station. Other stations in the area include WVOS 1240 AM and WVOS-FM 95.9 FM, licensed to the Village of Liberty. Thunder 102.1 Thunder Country has moved from Liberty to Monticello.

== Transportation ==
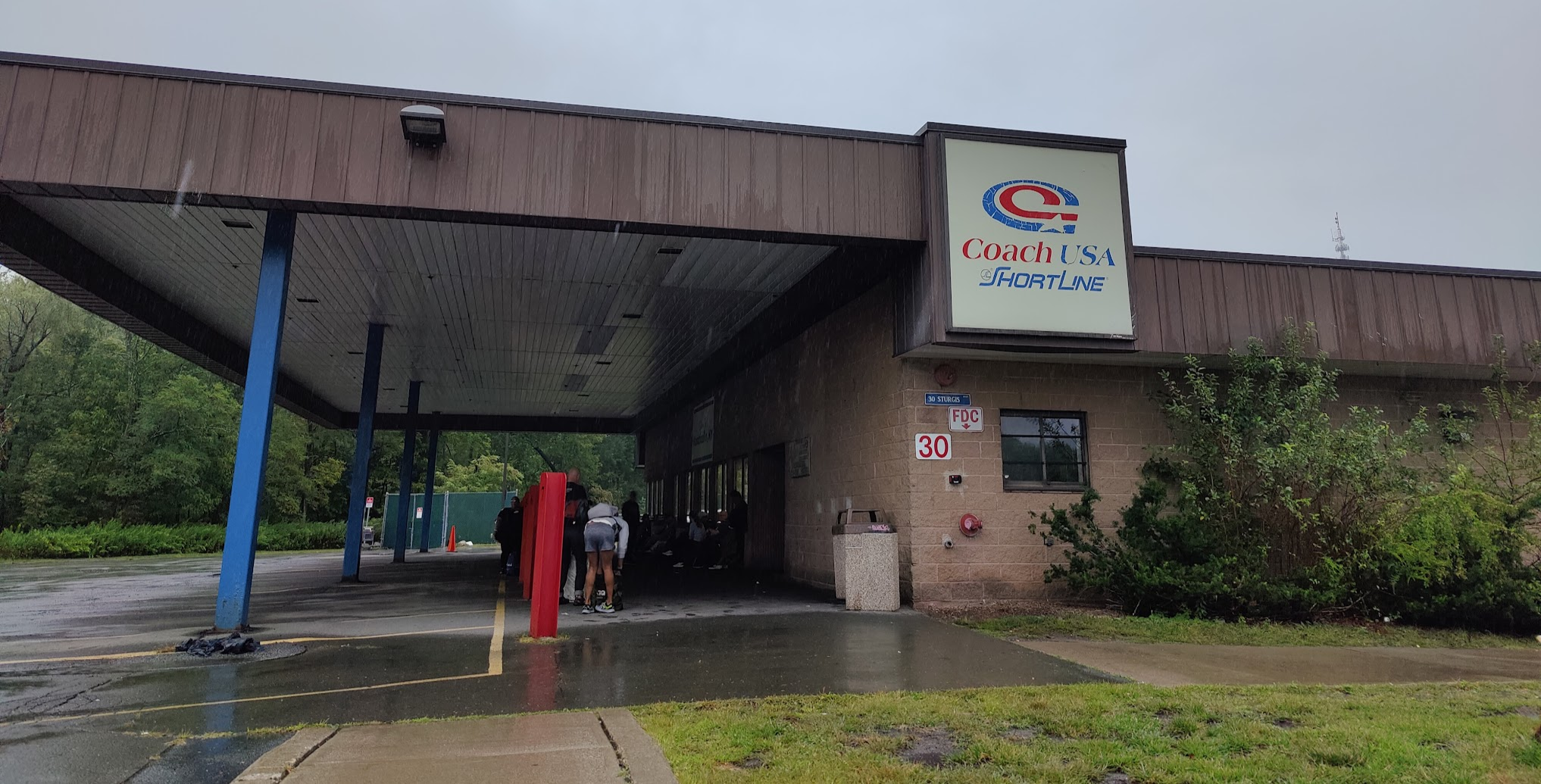
Monticello Coach USA Short Line Bus Stop

Monticello is located adjacent to New York State Route 17 (known regionally as the Quickway and eventually upgraded to be Interstate 86). It is also at the eastern terminus of New York State Route 17B. New York State Route 42 also serves the area, running North and South.

The local bus station is served by Coach USA Short Line, and the station acts as a hub for the region. There is also local service provided by Sullivan County Transportation that runs once a week on two routes.

The New York, Ontario & Western Railway had a branch to Monticello. Patronage was heavy until after World War II, when competition from the automobile led its abandonment on March 30, 1957.

== Tourism ==
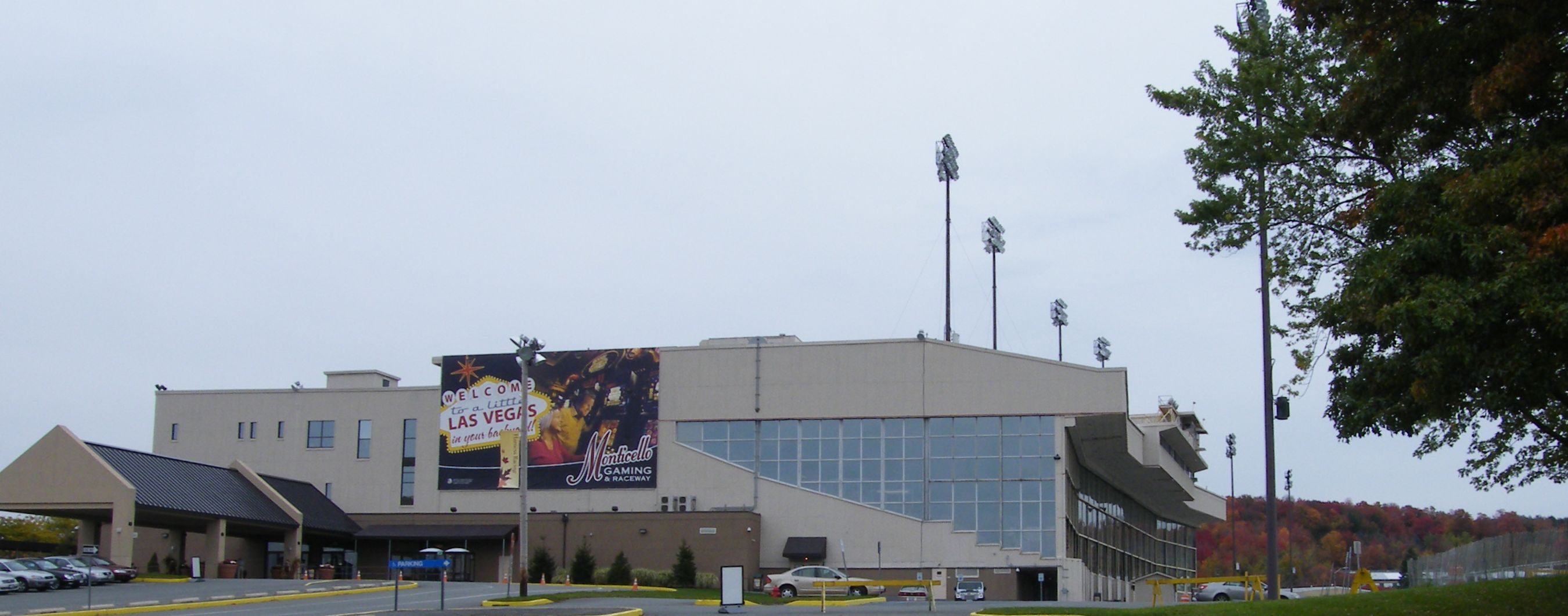
The Monticello Raceway

Monticello is known for its Monticello Raceway, which attracted people from all over the northeast in its heyday. The Raceway added a racino, hosting electronic slot machines as well as horse racing, but the casino portion of Monticello Casino and raceway was closed in 2019, and now serves as a raceway only. Just seven miles (11 km) away from the Raceway is Bethel Woods Center for the Arts, site of the 1969 Woodstock Festival. An auto racing circuit, Monticello Motor Club, is also located nearby. Resorts World Catskills, Vegas-style casino, luxury hotel and spa opened within the town's location near the Concord Resort property in February 2018.

The community— the center of what was colloquially known as the "Borscht Belt"— was once well known internationally for its massive Jewish resorts including the Concord and Grossinger's resorts. Only a handful survived into the 21st century. Kutsher's Hotel was one of the last to close, doing so in 2013. The remnants were auctioned off on February 6, 2014. Today, only the Raleigh Hotel remains open, as a retreat for mainly Orthodox Jews.

== Notable people ==
- Stephanie Blythe, opera singer
- Adelaide Mary Branch, teacher, author
- Lawrence H. Cooke, former Chief Judge of the New York State Court of Appeals who has a monument dedicated to him on the Sullivan County courthouse front lawn (now named the Lawrence H. Cooke Sullivan County Court House)
- Stanley Finch, the first director of the Bureau of Investigation, which is now the FBI.
- Robert S. Kapito, co-founder and president of Blackrock
- Judith Kaye, former Chief Judge of the New York State Court of Appeals
- Ivan C. Lafayette (1930–2016), politician
- Catello Manzi, harness racing driver
- Elisabeth Worth Muller, suffragist, clubwoman
- Daniel Bennett St. John, Original Owner of the New York Times.

== Houses of worship ==
- Chevro Ahavath Zion Synagogue
- Iglesia de Dios - Amor & Fe (Church of God Love & Faith) - Bilingual (Spanish & English)
- Monticello United Methodist Church https://www.umcmonticello.com/

St. Peter’s Roman Catholic Church
