= Monticello Raceway =

Horse racing track in New York, US

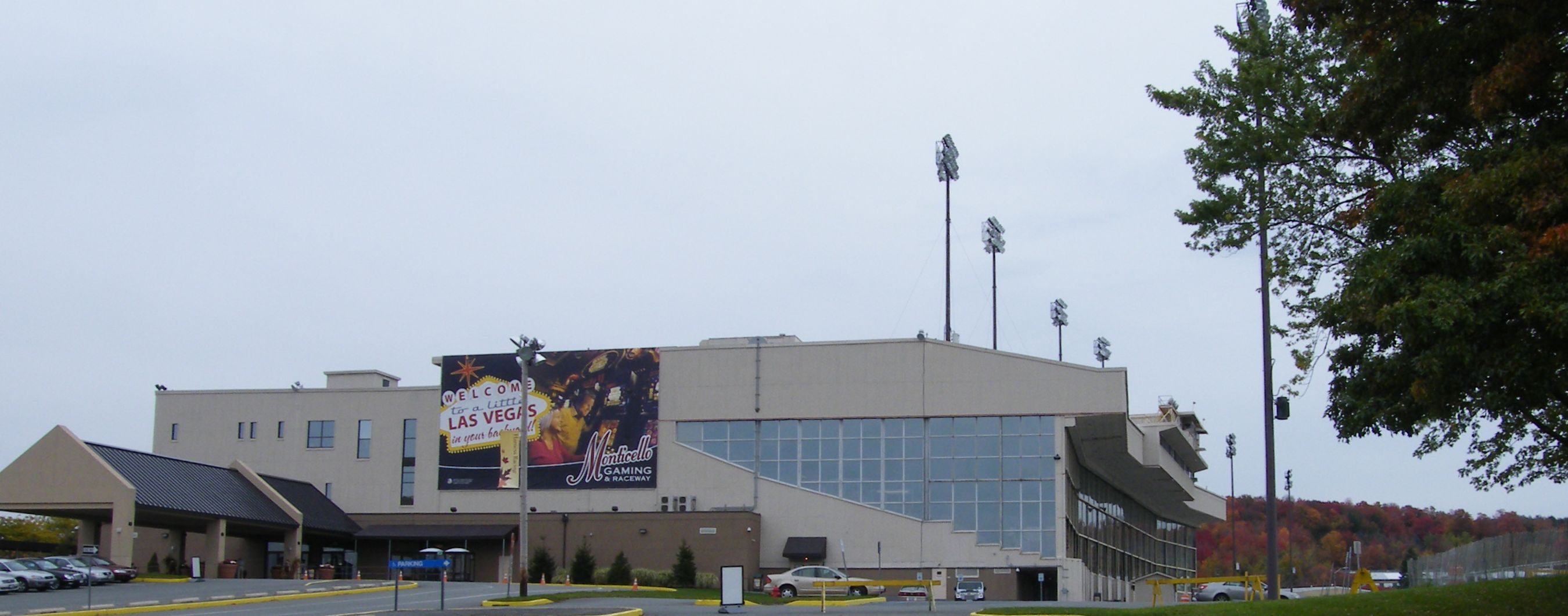
- Monticello Raceway in October 2008
- Interactive map of Monticello Raceway
- Location: 204 Route 17B; Monticello, New York
- Coordinates: 41.66872°N 74.714563°W
- Owned by: Empire Resorts
- Date opened: June 27, 1958
- Race type: harness racing

Monticello Raceway is a harness racing track and former casino in Monticello, New York. It is owned and operated by Empire Resorts.

The racetrack is nicknamed "The Mighty M" and races standardbred horse races during the afternoons year-round. The current racetrack is a 1/2 mile oval. The track opened on June 27, 1958 in order to attract more people to Monticello's resort area.

There had been attempts since 2000 to add a full-fledged Indian gaming casino operated by the St. Regis Mohawk tribe at the raceway, but they were met with backlash. Several Atlantic City casino operators, including Donald Trump, fought the proposal. Trump was fined for not disclosing his lobbying efforts. In January 2008, Dirk Kempthorne, Secretary of the United States Department of the Interior vetoed any Mohawk plans for a casino saying the Mohawk reservation on the Canada–United States border was too far from the track. The casino at the raceway operated under a state license permitting slot machines at designated race tracks.

In 2006, the track was the site of the so-called "Monticello Miracle", in which a racehorse hit World War II veteran Don Karkos in the exact spot where he had received shrapnel and lost sight in one of his eyes during a World War II naval battle aboard USS Rapidan (AO-18). This blow caused him to regain his sight, most likely by dislodging the shrapnel.

In February 2018, a full casino named Resorts World Catskills opened nearby, which was also owned by the same parent company as Monticello Raceway. In April 2019, the slots and racino part of Monticello Raceway were closed permanently, though, as of August 2026, racing continues year-round during the day from Mondays through Thursdays and on some Fridays when Monday is a holiday. There is a small OTB facility in a portion of the old racino/grandstands and an even smaller outdoor betting trailer with 1 or 2 mutuel tellers.
