= Resorts World Catskills =

Casino hotel in Monticello, New York

Coordinates: 41°39′26.9″N 74°38′48.8″W

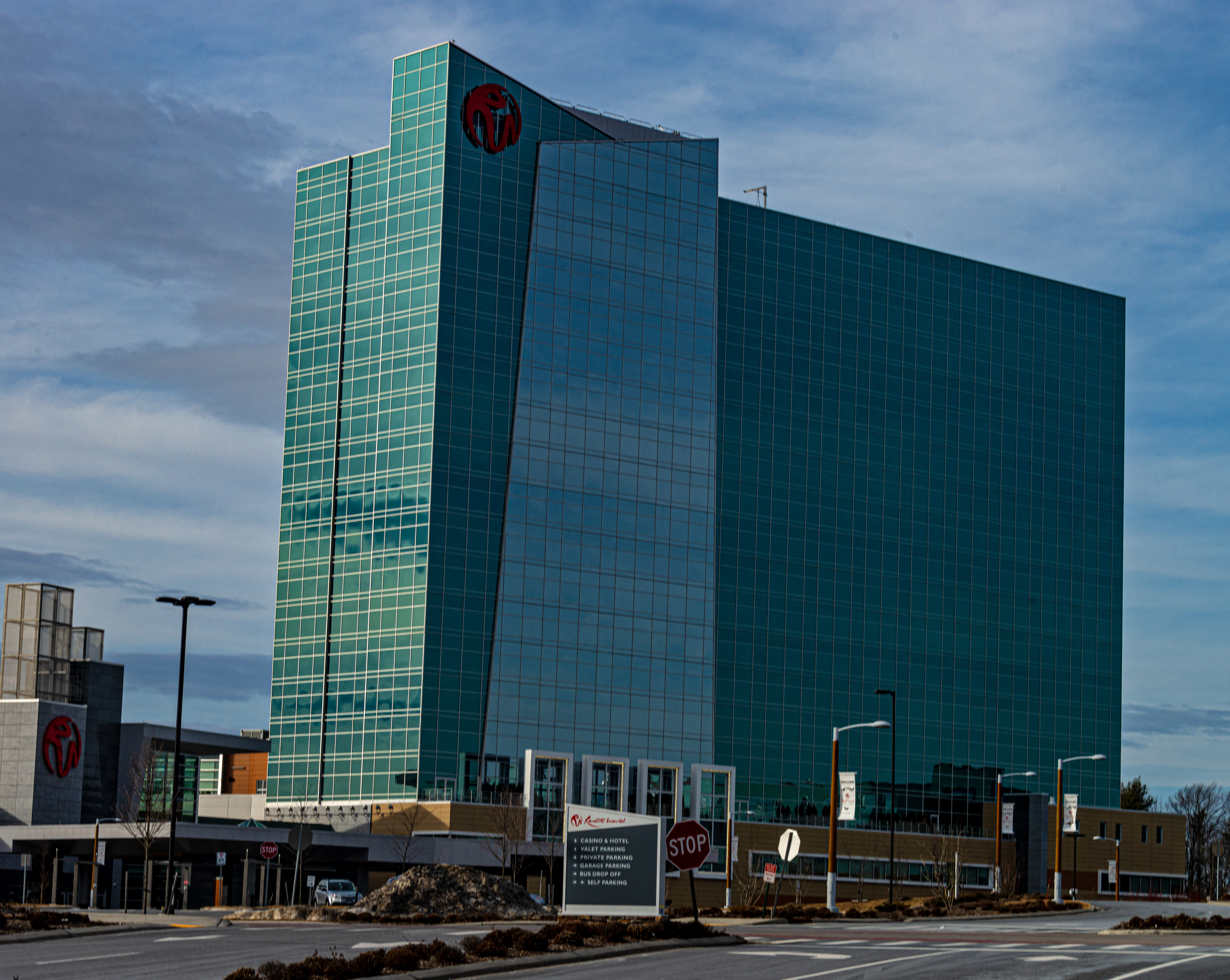
- Interactive map of Resorts World Catskills
- Location: Monticello, New York, U.S.; 888 Resorts World Drive
- Opened: February 8, 2018; 8 years ago
- No. of rooms: 332
- Gaming space: 65,000 sq ft (6,000 m^{2})
- Casino type: Land-based
- Owner: Empire Resorts
- Architect: JCJ Architecture
- Previous names: Montreign Resort Casino (in planning)
- Website: rwcatskills.com

Resorts World Catskills is a hotel and casino located in Monticello, New York.

== History ==
It opened on February 8, 2018, and is owned and operated by Empire Resorts. It was built on the former site of the Concord Hotel. The property features 65,000 square feet (6,000 m^{2}) of gaming space with 112 table games and over 2,150 slot machines, and an 18-story hotel tower with 332 suites.

The property was originally to be named Montreign Resort Casino but announced in April 2017 that it would instead license the Resorts World name from Genting Group, the majority owner of Empire Resorts.

In mid-2018, construction was begun on the Entertainment Village, a building next to the casino containing retail space, restaurants, and 105 hotel rooms. The project opened in December 2018 as The Alder at Resorts World Catskills.

In August 2019, an SEC filing indicated that Empire Resorts, the casino's parent company, was considering bankruptcy. During the period between the casino's February 2018 opening and June 2019, the company reported $211.5 million in losses. The Times Herald-Record asserted that the losses occurred "due to gross gaming revenues that lagged 45 percent below company projections in year-one alone, in a Northeast market over-saturated with gambling options".

== See also ==
- List of integrated resorts
- Resorts World New York City
