= Seminole Tribe v. Butterworth =

United States Court of Appeals for the Fifth Circuit case

Seminole Tribe of Florida v. Butterworth
- Court: United States Court of Appeals for the Fifth Circuit
- Full case name: SEMINOLE TRIBE OF FLORIDA, an Organized Tribe of Indians, as recognized under and by the Laws of the United States, Plaintiff-Appellee, v. Robert BUTTERWORTH, the duly elected Sheriff of Broward County, Florida, Defendant-Appellant.
- Decided: October 5 1981
- Citation: 658 F.2d 310

Case history
- Prior history: Aff'g 491 F. Supp.1015 (S.D. Fla. 1980).
- Subsequent history: Cert. denied, 455 U.S. 1020 (1982).

Holding
- The State of Florida does not have authority to enforce the Florida Bingo Statute on the Seminole Tribe of Florida's reservation, even though Florida is a Public Law 280 state, because the Bingo Statute is regulatory rather than prohibitory in nature.

Court membership
- Judges sitting: Lewis R. Morgan, Paul Hitch Roney, and Phyllis A. Kravitch

Case opinions
- Majority: Lewis R. Morgan, joined by Phyllis A. Kravitch
- Dissent: Paul Hitch Roney

Seminole Tribe of Florida v. Butterworth, 658 F.2d 310 (5th Cir. 1981), was a United States Court of Appeals for the Fifth Circuit case that significantly influenced the development of modern Native American gaming law. In Seminole Tribe, the Fifth Circuit ruled that the State of Florida did not have authority to enforce the Florida Bingo Statute on the Seminole Tribe of Florida's reservation, even though Florida is a Public Law 280 state with special rights to extend criminal and limited civil jurisdiction over Indian Country. Because of the decision, the Seminole Tribe was able to build and operate the nation's first tribally-owned high-stakes bingo parlor on their reservation in Florida, even though bingo for profit was illegal under Florida law at the time. Many other tribes later followed the Seminole Tribe's lead by building their own bingo parlors on their reservations, leading many scholars to call the Seminole Tribe's victory in this case the "birth" of modern commercial gambling on reservations.

== Case ==
=== Facts ===
In the 1970s, the Seminole Tribe contracted with a private limited partnership that agreed to build and operate a large, high-stakes bingo hall on the Tribe's reservation in exchange for a percentage of profits as management fees. The hall cost approximately $900,000 to construct, it was one of the nation's first high-stakes bingo parlors, and it was the very first tribally-owned high-stakes bingo parlor. The Tribe made this investment in the bingo hall despite the fact that the hall's planned operation would be "clearly in violation" of the Florida Bingo Statute at that time, Fla. Stat. § 849.093(repealed in 1992). The Bingo Statute only permitted certain charitable, religious, community, or other similar organizations to run bingo games, and even those organizations were limited to running games on less than two days per week with only one jackpot of less than $100 given out per day. The Tribe's bingo hall operated six days per week and handed out multiple jackpots a day of much higher than $100 value.

By 1979, construction on the bingo hall was completed. Shortly before the scheduled opening of the bingo hall, however, Robert Butterworth, the sheriff of Broward County, Florida, informed the Tribe he would make arrests for any violations of the Florida Bingo Statute on the reservation. In response, the Seminole Tribe filed a lawsuit in the United States District Court for the Southern District of Florida, seeking a declaratory judgment and injunctive relief against Sheriff Butterworth.

=== Issue and Arguments ===
The main issue in the case was whether the State of Florida, as a Public Law 280 state with special rights to exercise limited civil jurisdiction in Indian Country, had the authority to enforce the Florida Bingo Statute on the Seminole Tribe's reservation.

The Sheriff and the State of Florida, which participated in the lawsuit as amicus curiae, argued that the State of Florida had jurisdiction to enforce the Florida Bingo Statute on the Seminole Tribe's reservation. Normally, a state lacks jurisdiction over activity on Indian reservations unless the federal government explicitly grants the state that authority. However, a federal law called Public Law 280 granted certain states – including Florida – the right to exercise criminal and limited civil jurisdiction over Indian Country. Thus, Florida argued that because it is a Public Law 280 state, it possesses the authority to enforce the Florida Bingo Statute on the Seminole Tribe's reservation.

Meanwhile, the Seminole Tribe argued that the Sheriff and the State of Florida did not have the power to enforce the Florida Bingo Statute on the reservation. The Tribe argued that the Supreme Court case Bryan v. Itasca County indicates that, although Public Law 280 states have limited civil jurisdiction in Indian Country, they do not have "general regulatory powers." Because the Florida Bingo Statute simply set limits on when, where, and how bingo games could be run and played rather than outright prohibiting bingo games, the Tribe argued that the Statute was regulatory rather than prohibitory in nature, meaning the Sheriff could not enforce it on the Tribe's reservation under Bryan.

=== District Court Opinion ===
The District Court for the Southern District of Florida agreed with the Seminole Tribe, granting first a preliminary injunction and then summary judgment for the Tribe on the grounds that the Florida Bingo Statute was regulatory in nature and thus could not be enforced against the Tribe according to Bryan. The lower court enjoined the Sheriff from enforcing the statute, allowing the Seminole Tribe's bingo hall to open in December 1979.

=== Fifth Circuit Opinion ===
The Sheriff and the State of Florida appealed the District Court's decision to the Fifth Circuit, resulting in the opinion that is the subject of this Article. In this opinion, authored by Judge Lewis R. Morgan and joined by Judge Phyllis A. Kravitch, the Fifth Circuit affirmed the lower court's decision, finding for the Seminole Tribe on the same grounds.

The Fifth Circuit agreed with the lower court's interpretation and application of the Supreme Court's Bryan decision, explaining that in this case and others, the issue under Bryan is "whether the statute in question represents an exercise of the state's regulatory or prohibitory authority." According to the Fifth Circuit, a key consideration in this analysis is "whether the operation of bingo games is prohibited as against the public policy of the state or merely regulated by the state." In this case, because the Florida Bingo Statute dictated that certain kinds of bingo events played for charitable, community, religious, or other similar purposes should still be permitted in the state, the Fifth Circuit concluded that the State of Florida must not consider the game of bingo "against the public policy of the state of Florida." Instead, Florida's aim with regards to bingo appeared to be preventing abuses by imposing "certain limitations." In other words, Florida sought to regulate bingo to prevent it from becoming a money-making business. Thus, because the Bingo Statute did not prohibit bingo outright as against the public policy of Florida, the Fifth Circuit held that the Florida Bingo Statute was merely regulatory in nature even though it included potential penal sanctions for violation of the statute. As a result, the Fifth Circuit held the Florida Bingo Statute could not be enforced by the Sheriff on the Seminole Tribe's reservation.

Finally, the Fifth Circuit also clarified that the Florida Bingo Statute could not be enforced against either Indians or non-Indians on the reservation. Although the Sheriff and the State of Florida argued that they should at least be permitted to apply the Bingo Statute against non-Indians playing bingo on the reservation, the Fifth Circuit held that such enforcement would still qualify as an impermissible infringement on the Tribe's own power to conduct bingo games without interference from Florida regulation, thereby violating Bryan.

=== Fifth Circuit Dissent ===
Judge Paul Hitch Roney dissented from the majority's opinion in Seminole Tribe, arguing instead that Florida's Bingo Statute was clearly prohibitory in nature with regards to bingo played for commercial profit. In fact, Judge Roney emphasized that the Seminole Tribe bingo parlor's great success was largely due to the universal prohibition of such bingo throughout the rest of the state. Finally, because the Seminole Tribe failed to show that the effects of the bingo reservation were confined to the reservation, Judge Roney concluded that Florida had just as strong a reason for prohibiting such bingo playing on the reservation as off the reservation. Thus, Judge Roney stated he would reverse the District Court's decision instead of affirm.

== Significance ==
=== Influence on the Development of Indian Gaming Law ===
Scholars often point to the Seminole Tribe's victory in this case as the birth of modern commercial Indian gaming. The Seminole Tribe was the first tribe to open a bingo hall on its reservation, and this case was the first to deal with a Public Law 280 state's efforts to put a stop to such gaming. Thus, the Seminole Tribe's victory in this case was significant not only to them, but to many other tribes hoping to use high-stakes bingo parlors as a source of revenue and a means of attracting companies and jobs to the reservation. The case signaled that tribes may be able to expand even a narrow exception in a state's gambling law "into a legal loophole for high-stakes, profit-generating" gambling on their reservations.

Just a year after the Fifth Circuit's Seminole Tribe decision, a similar case called Barona Group v. Duffy arose in California. Citing to Seminole Tribe and stating that they found it "persuasive," the Ninth Circuit held that California could not enforce its bingo laws on a tribe's reservation because California allowed bingo games in some contexts, meaning its statute was merely regulatory. Decisions from at least six additional circuits later followed suit, upholding tribes' right to conduct high-stakes bingo on their reservations even though they were located within states that barred commercial gambling, but made exceptions for activities such as low-stakes charitable bingo games. Thus, the Seminole Tribe case – and the cases from other circuits following it – "opened the floodgates" to high-stakes bingo on tribes' reservations in any one of the forty-five states that, by the mid-1980s, had exceptions in their bingo laws for low-stakes bingo games carried out by religious, charitable, educational, or other similar groups.

Then in 1987, the Seminole Tribe case was cited in California v. Cabazon Band of Mission Indians, a seminal Supreme Court decision on Indian gaming. In this case, the Court found that the prohibitory/regulatory distinction drawn in Seminole Tribe and other circuit cases was consistent with Bryan's construction of Public Law 280. Applying a balancing test and reasoning similar to Seminole Tribe, the Court held that the State could not prevent the Cabazon Band of Mission Indians from continuing its bingo operations, even when faced with concerns about organized crime.

Finally, following the rapid expansion of bingo parlors on reservations after Seminole Tribe, the landmark Cabazon decision, and the resultant increasing pressure from states to provide for some means of state control over gaming on reservations, Congress passed the Indian Gaming Regulatory Act in 1988, the major federal law establishing the framework currently governing Indian gaming.

=== Impact on the Seminole Tribe ===
In the mid-1970s, the Seminole Tribe was in need of additional funds for its tribal government. Congress had adopted a new policy of tribal self-determination earlier in the decade, but although the new policy granted additional rights and powers to Tribes, congressional appropriations to Tribes had only declined. The Tribe believed it needed to develop a large and robust revenue source that would decrease their reliance on federal government funding.

The Seminole Tribe first turned to opening smokeshops that sold tax-free cigarettes in 1976, generating about $1.5 million in revenue in the first few years. This was a start, but the Tribe believed it needed more revenue to gain greater independence. So in 1979, the Tribe turned to building the bingo hall on its reservation instead.

Once the Seminole Tribe's bingo hall was permitted to open in December 1979, it proved to be the significant source of revenue the Tribe had hoped for. By a year after the bingo hall had opened, the hall was producing revenues of $1 million per month. Smokeshop revenue was also bolstered by the bingo business, reaching $800,000 per month.

Since then, the Seminole Tribe has been a leader in developing and defending Indian gaming. By 2000, the Tribe operated 5 casinos, attracting an estimated 2 million visitors annually and contributing $65 million to the local economy. By 2002, the Tribe's Gaming Department employed almost 2,000 individuals. And in 2001, the tribe's budget exceeded $200 million, with over 95 percent of funds coming from casino revenues. According to the Seminole Tribe's website, the Tribe's gaming enterprises and other subsequent business ventures "have brought the Seminoles closer to their stated goal of self-reliance."
