= Native American gaming =

Gambling operations on Indian reservations in the United States

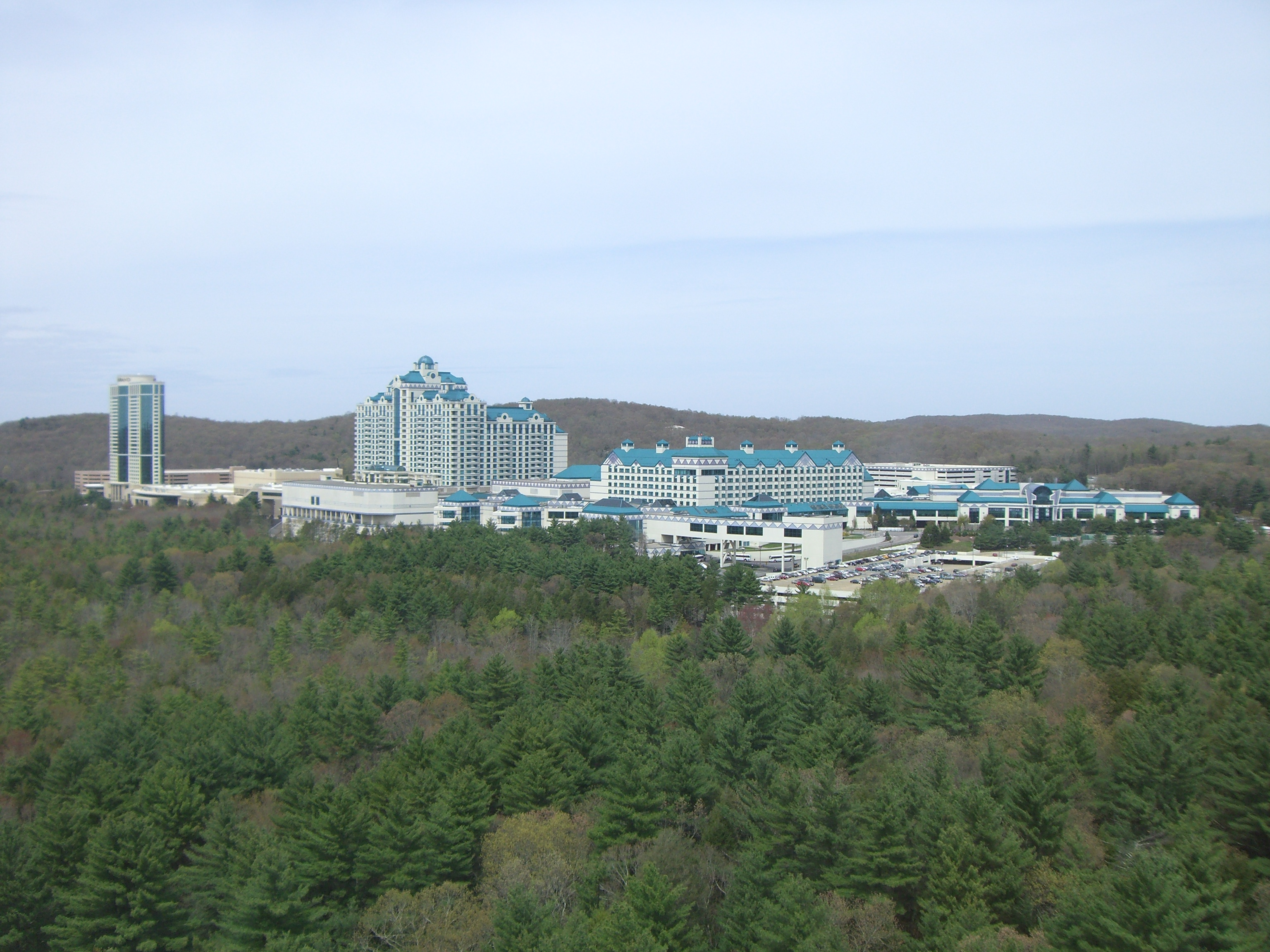
The Foxwoods Resort Casino in Ledyard, Connecticut is one of the largest casinos in the world, and is owned by the Mashantucket Pequot Tribe.

Native American gaming comprises casinos, bingo halls, slots halls and other gambling operations on Indian reservations or other tribal lands in the United States. Because these areas have tribal sovereignty, states have limited ability to forbid gambling there, as codified by the Indian Gaming Regulatory Act of 1988. As of 2024, there were 532 gambling operations run by 243 tribes, with a total annual revenue of $43.9 billion.

== History ==
In the early 1970s, Russell and Helen Bryan, a married Chippewa couple living in a mobile home on northern Minnesota's Leech Lake Indian Reservation, received a property tax bill from Itasca County, where their property resided. The Bryans had never received a property tax bill from the county before. Unwilling to pay it, they took the tax notice to local legal aid attorneys at Leech Lake Legal Services, who brought suit to challenge the tax in the state courts. The Bryans lost their case in the state district court, and they lost again on appeal in a unanimous decision by the Minnesota Supreme Court. They then sought review at the Supreme Court of the United States. The Supreme Court granted review, and in a sweeping and unanimous decision authored by Justice Brennan, the Supreme Court held not only that states do not have authority to tax Natives on their reservations, but that they also lack the authority to regulate Native activities on their reservations. Within a few years, enterprising Natives and tribes began to operate bingo operations in numerous different locations around the United States.

Under the leadership of Howard Tommie, the Seminole Tribe of Florida built a large high-stakes bingo building on their reservation near Fort Lauderdale, Florida. The tribe planned for the bingo hall to be open six days a week, contrary to Florida state law which only allows two days a week for bingo halls to be open, as well as going over the maximum limit of $100 jackpots. The law was enacted from the charity bingo limits set by Catholic churches. The sheriff of Broward County, where the Native reservation lies, made arrests the minute the bingo hall opened, and the tribe sued the county (Seminole Tribe v. Butterworth), stating that Native tribes have sovereignty rights that are protected by the federal government from interference by state government. A District Court ruled in favor of the Natives, citing Chief Justice John Marshall in Worcester v. Georgia.

Controversy arose when Natives began putting private casinos, bingo rooms, and lotteries on reservation lands and began setting gaming prizes which were above the maximum legal limit of the state. The Natives argued for sovereignty over their reservations to make them immune from state laws such as Public Law 280, which granted states to have criminal jurisdiction over Native reservations. States were afraid that Natives would have a significant competitive advantage over other gambling establishments in the state which were regulated, which would thus generate a vast amount of income for tribes.

In the late 1970s and continuing into the next decade, the delicate question concerning the legality of tribal gaming and immunity from state law hovered over the Supreme Court. The Organized Crime Control Act of 1970 made it illegal to conduct gaming on tribal lands if said gaming would violate state laws, although the federal government did not take steps to enforce this statute. A report by the Department of Justice presented to the Senate Select Committee on Indian Affairs on March 18, 1992, concluded that through several years of FBI investigation, organized crime had failed to infiltrate Native gaming and that there was no link between criminal activity in Native gaming and organized crime.

A Supreme Court ruling issued on July 9, 2020, which expanded tribal jurisdiction for the Muscogee (Creek) Nation in Oklahoma also opened the possibility for Native Americans to have more power to regulate casino gambling.

=== Cabazon Band, 1980 ===
In the early 1960s, the Cabazon Band of Mission Indians, near Indio, California, were extremely poor and did not have much land because of neglected treaties in the 1850s by state senators. Historian Stuart Banner stated that the Cabazon Band and the neighboring Morongo Reservation had "some HUD buildings and a few trailers, but that was about it. There was nothing really there. The people simply didn't have a lot." The Cabazon Band turned to casino operations, opening bingo and poker halls in 1980. Shortly thereafter, the Indio police and the Riverside County Sheriff shut down the gambling halls and arrested numerous Natives while seizing any cash and merchandise held in the tribe's possession. The Cabazon Band sued in federal court (California v. Cabazon Band) and won, as did the Seminole Tribe in Florida. The Supreme Court reviewed the case in 1986 to reach a decision over whether Native reservations are controlled by state law. The Court again ruled that Native gaming was to be regulated exclusively by Congress and the federal government, not state government. With tribal sovereignty upheld, the benefits of gaming became available to many tribes.

=== Indian Gaming Regulatory Act ===
In 1988, Congress passed the Indian Gaming Regulatory Act (IGRA) (signed by President Ronald Reagan) which kept tribal sovereignty to create casino-like halls, but the states and Natives must be in Tribal-State compacts and the federal government has the power to regulate the gaming. These compacts have been used by state officials to confiscate Native casino revenue which serves as a "special" tax on Native reservations. Essentially, the tribes still have "exclusive right" to all classes of gaming except when states do not accept that class or it clashes with federal law.

Class III Native gaming became a large issue for the states and federal government, because of these court cases, as Congress debated over a bill for Native gaming called the Indian Gaming Regulatory Act.

Currently, all attempts to challenge the Indian Gaming Regulatory Act on constitutional grounds have failed.

In 1988, when President Reagan signed the IGRA, Native gaming revenue stood at $100 million. By 1995, revenues had risen to $5.4 billion, and by 2004 they reached $19.4 billion. The National Indian Gaming Commission was created in 1988 following the IGRA's enactment to regulate Native gaming.

The Commission consists of three members: a chairman who is appointed by the US president with the consent of the Senate, and two associate members appointed by the Secretary of the Interior. Each member serves a three-year term and must pass a detailed background check by the US Attorney General.

The NIGC withholds certain powers over Class II and Class III gaming. These include budget approval, civil fines, fees, subpoenas, and permanent orders. The NIGC monitors Class II gaming on Native lands on a continuing basis through inspection, investigation, access to records, and contracts. As for Class III gaming, all contracts must be approved by the chairman of the NIGC. 200 of the 562 federally recognized tribes created Class III gaming of large casinos and high jackpots.

This rise of gaming not only brought great revenue but also corruption. In January 2006, the Jack Abramoff Indian lobbying scandal took place, involving lobbyists convicted of felonies such as conspiracy, fraud, and tax evasion. These lobbyists, Jack Abramoff, Ralph Reed, Grover Norquist, and Michael Scanlon, bribed members of Congress when lobbying for Native casinos, then overcharged their Native clients; this generated around $90 million in fees from the Natives.

=== 2006 legislation ===
In 2006, Congress introduced legislation to protect their own casino interests from those tribes that are outside reservations. Further, the Bureau of Indian Affairs (BIA) has faced increasing pressure to tighten regulatory policy and oversight of casino approvals. In particular, the BIA has been instructed by Congress to implement new procedures after two decades of IGRA's existence. These procedures would allow local communities to have more influence in the siting of casinos in their community and would make the process of casino approval more transparent. To many tribes, however, the proposed regulations will further encroach on tribal sovereignty.

== Regulatory schemes ==
Statistics provided by the National Indian Gaming Commission (NIGC), indicate that there are 460 Native gaming establishments in the US. These casinos are operated by 240 federally recognized tribes and offer Class I, Class II and Class III gaming. Gaming is divided into 3 classes with a different regulatory scheme for each:

=== Class I ===
Class I gaming is defined as (1) traditional Indian gaming, which may be part of tribal ceremonies and celebrations, and (2) social gaming for minimal prizes. Regulatory authority over class I gaming is vested exclusively in tribal governments and is not subject to IGRA's requirements.

=== Class II ===
Class II gaming is defined as the game of chance commonly known as bingo (whether or not electronic, computer, or other technological aids are used in connection therewith) and, if played in the same location as the bingo, pull tabs, punch board, tip jars, instant bingo, and other games similar to bingo. Class II gaming also includes non-banked card games, that is, games that are played exclusively against other players rather than against the house or a player acting as a bank. The Act specifically excludes slot machines or electronic facsimiles of any game of chance from the definition of class II games.

Tribes retain their authority to conduct, license, and regulate class II gaming so long as the state in which the Tribe is located permits such gaming for any purpose, and the Tribal government adopts a gaming ordinance approved by the National Indian Gaming Commission (NIGC). Tribal governments are responsible for regulating class II gaming with Commission oversight. Only Hawaii and Utah continue to prohibit all types of gaming.

=== Class III ===
The definition of class III gaming is broad. It includes all forms of gaming that are neither class I nor II. Games commonly played at casinos, such as slot machines, blackjack, craps, and roulette, clearly fall in the class III category, as well as wagering games and electronic facsimiles of any game of chance. Generally, class III is often referred to as casino-style gaming. As a compromise, the Act restricts Tribal authority to conduct class III gaming.

Before a Tribe may lawfully conduct class III gaming, the following conditions must be met:

- The Particular form of class III gaming that the Tribe wants to conduct must be permitted in the state in which the tribe is located.
- The Tribe and the state must have negotiated a compact that has been approved by the Secretary of the Interior, or the Secretary must have approved regulatory procedures.
- The Tribe must have adopted a Tribal gaming ordinance that has been approved by the chairman of the commission.

The regulatory scheme for class III gaming is more complex than a casual reading of the statute might suggest. Although Congress clearly intended regulatory issues to be addressed in Tribal-State compacts, it left a number of key functions in federal hands, including approval authority over compacts, management contracts, and Tribal gaming ordinances. Congress also vested the commission with broad authority to issue regulations in furtherance of the purposes of the Act. Accordingly, the Commission plays a key role in the regulation of class II and III gaming.

The revenue generated in these establishments was close to $27.1 billion in 2011 up from $12.8 billion in 2001. The regions with largest revenues in 2011 were Sacramento ($6.9 billion) and Washington State ($6.7 billion). The Native American gaming industry has been described as "recession-resistant", although tribes in many states (including Arizona, California, Connecticut and New Mexico) saw revenues fall at a similar rate to commercial casinos during the Great Recession of 2007–2009.

Tribal casinos in the eastern US generated roughly $3.8 billion in FY02. Those in the Central US recorded gross revenues of approximately $5.9 billion, while those in the Western US generated nearly $4.8 billion. Most of the revenues generated in the Native gaming are from casinos located in or near large metropolitan areas. Currently, 12% of Native gaming establishments generate 65% of Native gaming revenues. Native gaming operations located in the populous areas of the West Coast (primarily California) represent the fastest growing sector of the Native gaming industry. As suggested by the above figures, the vast majority of tribal casinos are much less financially successful, particularly those in the Midwest and Great Plains. Many tribes see this limited financial success as being tempered by decreases in reservation unemployment and poverty rates, although socioeconomic deficits remain.

As of 2008 there are 562 federally recognized tribes in the United States, many of which have chosen not to enter the gambling industry.

== By state ==
=== California ===
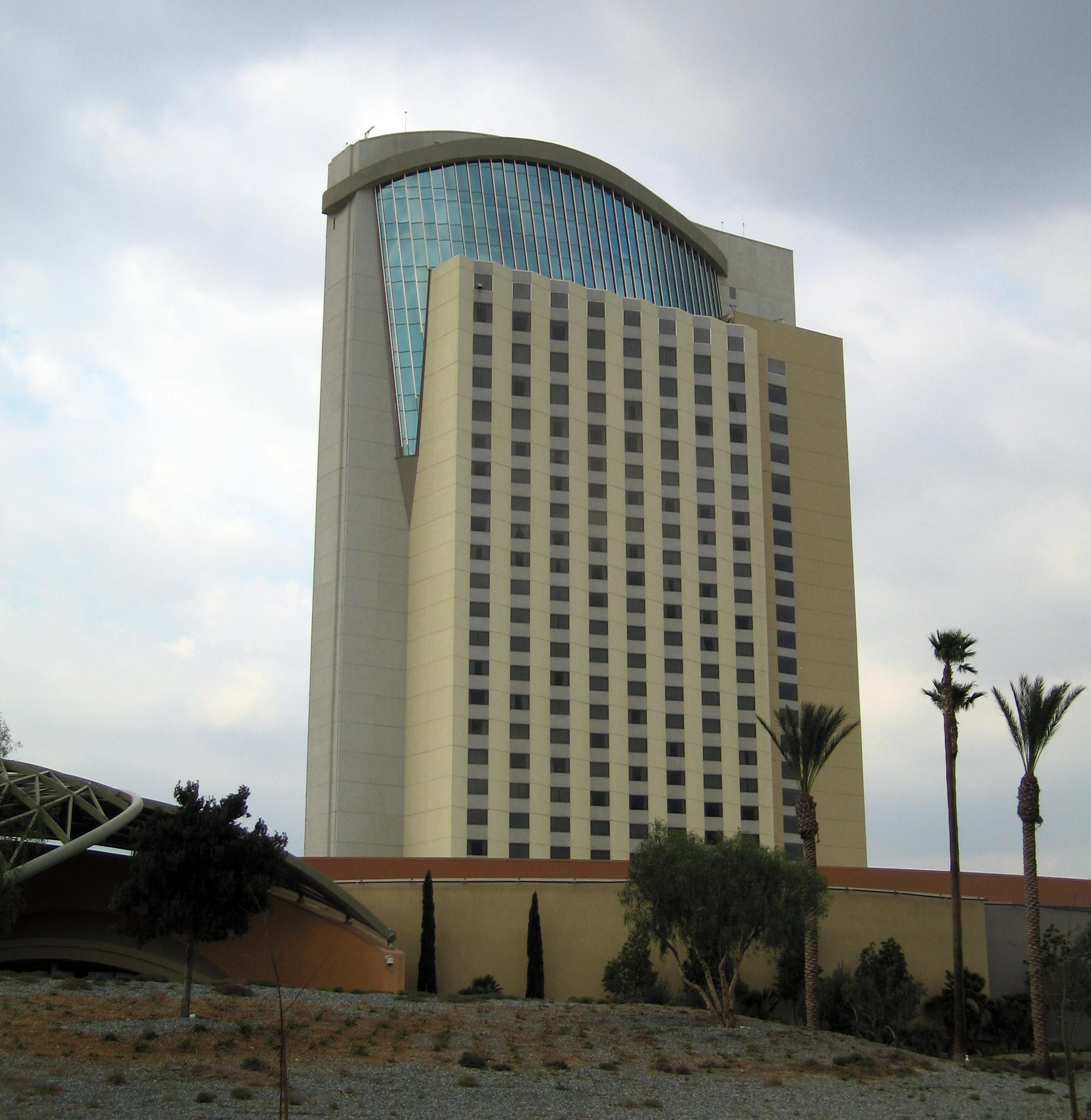
The Morongo Casino, Resort & Spa in Cabazon, California is operated by the Morongo Band of Mission Indians

The largest casino in the state of California is the Yaamava' Resort & Casino in Highland, with over 7,000 slot machines and 290,000 square feet of gaming area. Other large gaming operations include the Pechanga Resort and Casino in Temecula, with 3,000+ slot machines and approximately 200,000 sq ft (19,000 m^{2}) of gaming space, Morongo Casino, Resort & Spa, Chumash Casino Resort, Harrah's Resort Southern California, Barona Casino, Pala Casino Resort and Spa, Thunder Valley Casino Resort, Graton Resort & Casino and Cache Creek Casino Resort. Tribal casinos in California generate $9 billion in revenue annually.

=== Connecticut ===
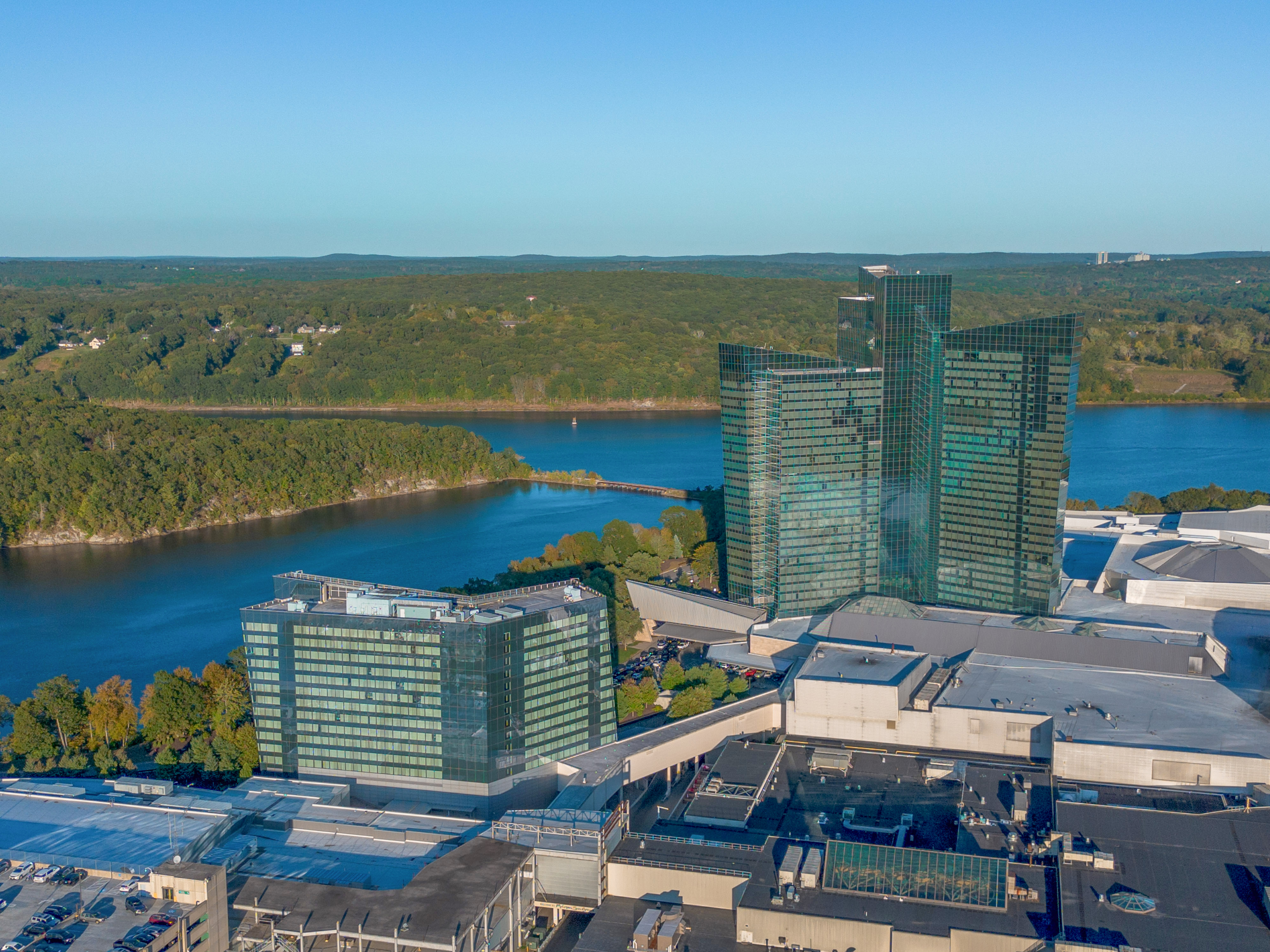
The Mohegan Sun resort in Uncasville, Connecticut is operated by the Mohegan Tribe.

The Foxwoods Resort Casino opened in 1992 in Ledyard, Connecticut. Operated by the Mashantucket Pequot Tribe and earning $1.5 billion, it was more profitable than any one casino in Las Vegas or Atlantic City. With 7,200 slot machines and 380 table games, the 314,000-square-foot (29,200 m^{2}) Foxwoods Resort Casino is the largest casino in the US and second largest in the world after Venetian Macao. Today, the property spans 1.5 miles from end to end, with 6 casinos, four hotels, more than 30 restaurants, two theaters, two spas, and more than one hundred retailers. The agreement between the Mashantucket Pequot Tribal Nation and the State of Connecticut promises the state $80 million or 25% of their annual slot revenue. Since Foxwoods opened in 1992, the state of Connecticut has received more than $4 billion in slot revenue from Foxwoods alone.

The Mohegan Sun Resort & Casino is also located in Connecticut, and is owned and operated by the Mohegan Tribe. The Mohegan Tribe approached the Mashantucket Pequots in the early 1990s for permission to pursue gaming. Although doing so would relinquish their gaming monopoly in Connecticut, the Mashantuckets granted the Mohegans their request, who then opened Mohegan Sun in 1996. This enterprise is 580,000 square feet (54,000 m^{2}) and consists of 6,500 slot machines and 180 table games. It is the second largest casino in the United States, located 7 miles away from Foxwoods in Uncasville, Connecticut. Since opening in 1996, the state of Connecticut has received more than $3 billion in slot revenue from Mohegan Sun alone.

The success of both casinos is due in no small part to their location roughly halfway between New York City and Boston.

The economic recession that began in 2007 took a heavy toll of receipts, and by 2012 both Foxwoods in Connecticut and its nearby rival the Mohegan Sun were deeply in debt. The New York Times Magazine said "Foxwoods is fighting for its life", with debts of $2.3 billion. In August 2012, the tribe owning the Foxwoods Casino restructured over a billion dollars in debt in an attempt to remain profitable.

=== Florida ===
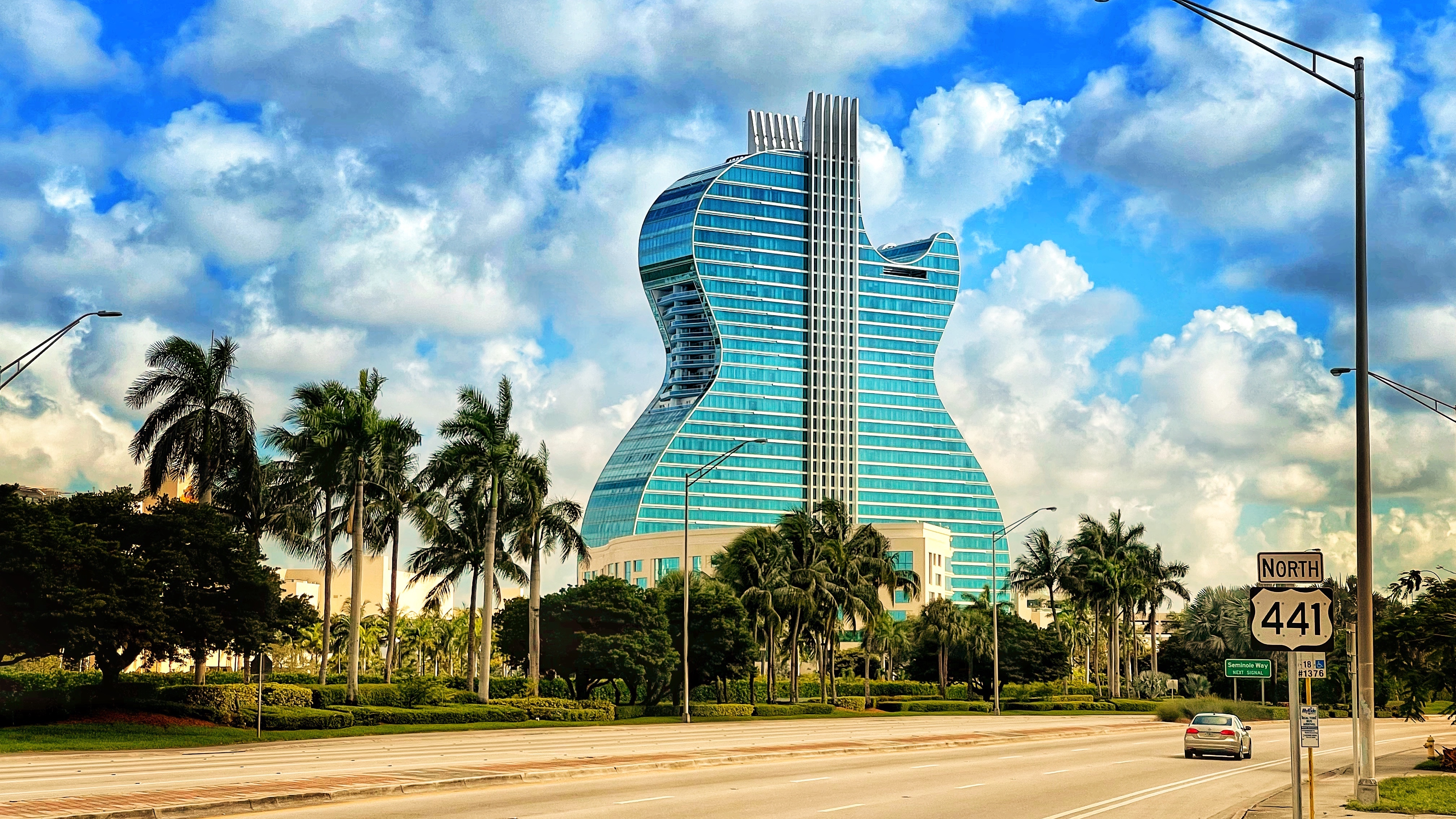
The Seminole Hard Rock Hotel & Casino Hollywood in Hollywood, Florida is operated by the Seminole Tribe of Florida.

The Seminole Hard Rock Hotel & Casino, also known as "The Guitar Hotel", is a hotel and casino resort near Hollywood, Florida, United States, located on 100 acres (40 ha) of the Hollywood Reservation of the Seminole Tribe of Florida. The property currently has one hotel tower, a 140,000 sq ft (13,000 m^{2}) casino, large poker room, a 4 acres (1.6 ha) lagoon-style pool facility with a center bar and many private cabanas, restaurants, shops, spa, bars and nightclubs, and the Hard Rock Event Center. A large expansion was completed in October 2019.

=== Idaho ===
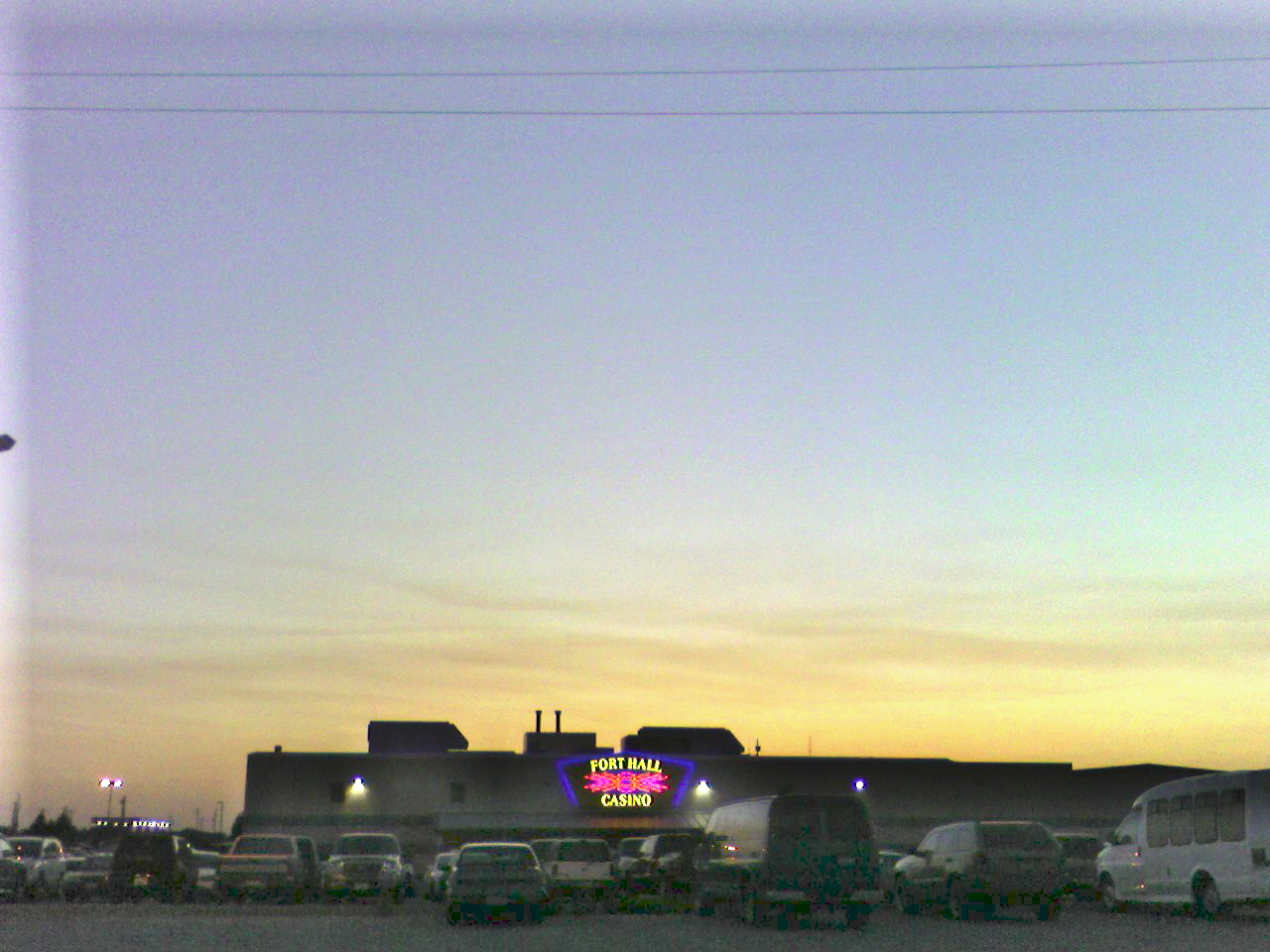
The Fort Hall Casino in Fort Hall, Idaho is operated by the Shoshone and Bannock Tribes

The Coeur d’Alene Casino is located in Idaho, US. Founded in 1993, the establishment consists the Circling Raven Golf Club, two luxury hotels, 100,000 square feet of casino space, and various restaurants. The Coeur d’Alene Casino currently employs an average of 1000 local residents, making it one of the largest employers in the region. A part of the casino's profits are invested back to the Coeur d'Alene people in education and various investment projects.

The Shoshone-Bannock Tribe also operates a slots-only casino in Fort Hall, Idaho, located just outside Pocatello, Idaho.

=== Indiana ===
The state of Indiana's first tribal casino was opened on 16 January 2017. The 175,000-square-foot Four Winds Casino is located in South Bend and is operated by the Pokagon Band of Potawatomi Indians.

=== Minnesota ===
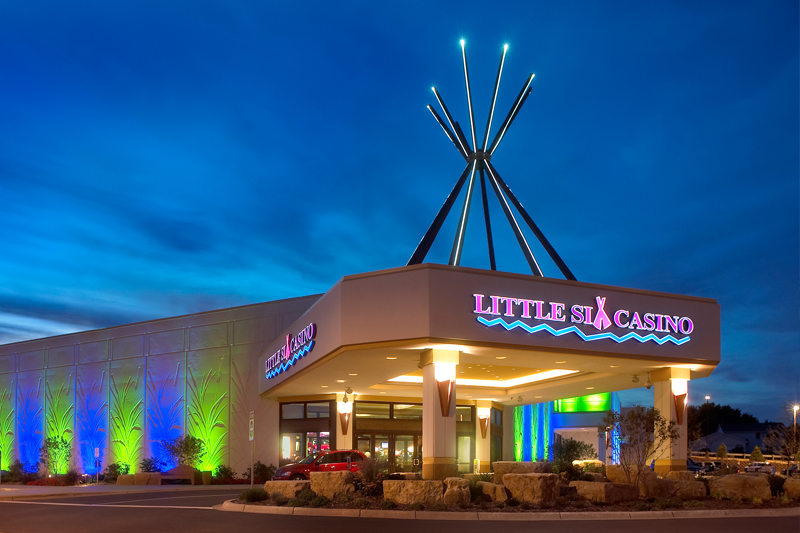
The Little Six Casino in Prior Lake, Minnesota is operated by the Shakopee Mdewakanton Sioux Community.

The biggest casino in Minnesota is Mystic Lake Casino Hotel. Mystic Lake Casino Hotel is owned and operated by the Shakopee Mdewakanton Sioux Community (SMSC) in Prior Lake, Minnesota, United States, southwest of Minneapolis and Saint Paul. With 4,100 employees, the SMSC – including Mystic Lake Casino Hotel and Little Six Casino – is the largest employer in Scott County. The casino's gambling options include slots, bingo, video roulette, pulltabs, and live dealer blackjack. Mystic Lake also offers bars, restaurants, shows, special events, and accommodations.

The Treasure Island Resort & Casino is a tribal gaming facility owned and operated by the Prairie Island Indian Community (PIIC) in Welch, MN – Goodhue County. It is the only casino resort in southern Minnesota located on the Mississippi River. The casino's gaming options include slot machines; video roulette, blackjack and keno; live dealer blackjack, poker and other table games; and bingo. Additional amenities to the property include a hotel, the Island Event Center, a marina, RV-park, a cruise yacht, a 24-lane bowling center, several restaurants; and a water park and spa. Employing nearly 1,500 people, Treasure Island Resort & Casino is the largest employer in Goodhue County.

=== New York ===
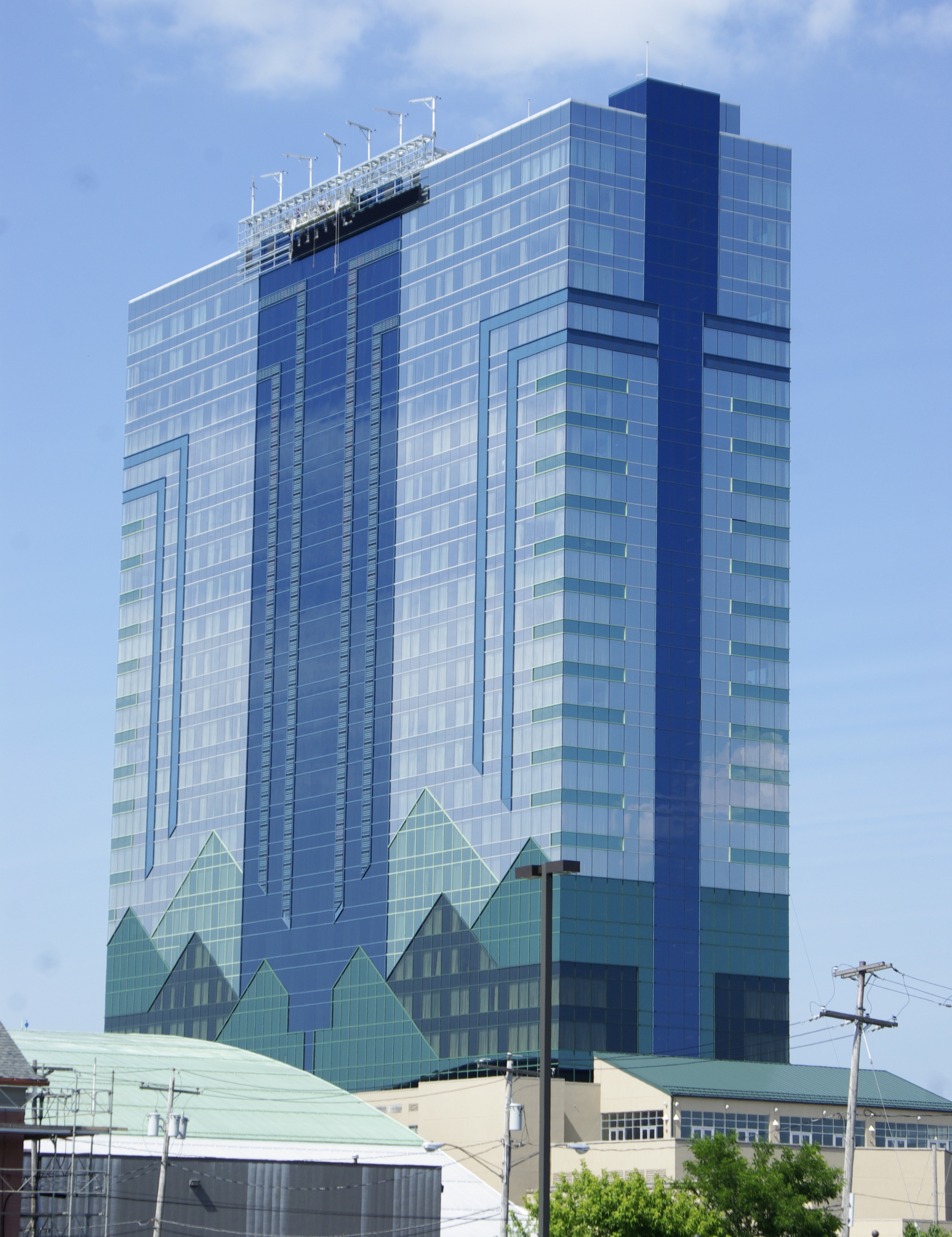
The Seneca Niagara Casino & Hotel in Niagara Falls, New York is operated by Seneca Nation of New York.

In March 1994 the Mohawk people created a joint venture with Alpha Hospitality to develop and operate a gaming facility on tribal lands. In January 1996 they entered into a memorandum with Robert A. Berman's Catskill Development, L.L.C. regarding the development and management of a casino adjacent to the Monticello Raceway. The project received approval from the National Indian Gaming Commission.

In 1999, however, the Mohawk tribe signed an agreement to build the casino with Park Place Entertainment instead. The Akwesasne Mohawk Casino (AMC) was inaugurated that same year in Hogansburg, New York. The facility comprises 140,000 square feet of casino floor space that includes over 1,800 slot machines and 30 table games, as well as a luxury hotel, spas, restaurants, and a number of entertainment venues. The casino is managed by the Mohawk Nation.

=== Oklahoma ===
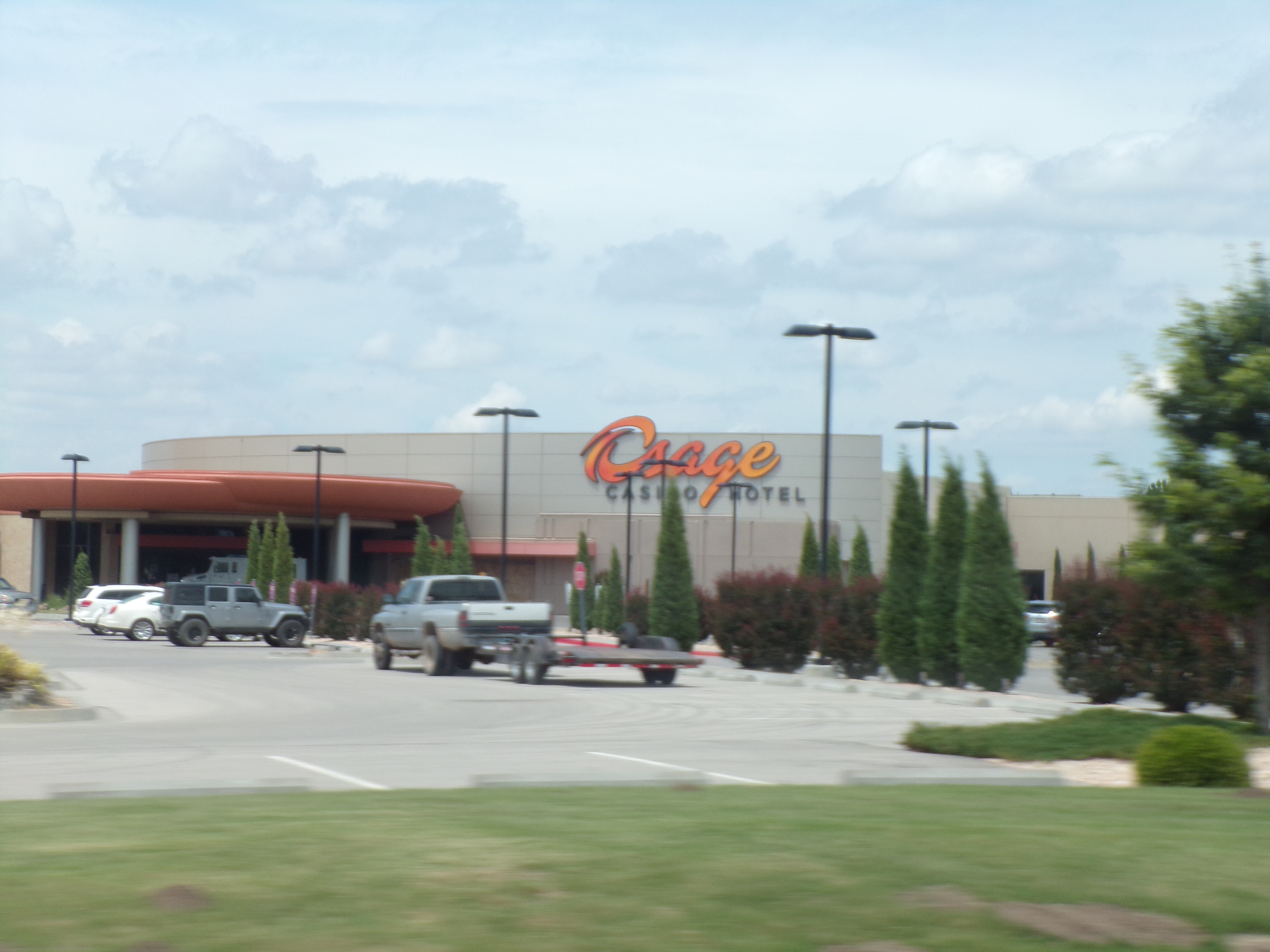
The Osage Casino in Ponca City, Oklahoma is one of seven casinos operated by Osage Nation in Oklahoma.

Native gaming revenues in Oklahoma rose to $3.23 billion in 2010, representing 44 percent of all U.S. casinos. Oklahoma surpassed Connecticut as second in the United States for gaming revenue, according to Alan Meister, an economist with Nathan Associates Inc. Oklahoma has 113 tribal casinos, more than any other state in the U.S. A 2015 report on U.S. Gaming says that Oklahoma has the most gaming machines. WinStar World Casino in Thackerville, Oklahoma, is the largest casino on Earth with more than 600,000 square feet of gaming floor. Much of this success is due to geography: the Dallas-Fort Worth metroplex is roughly an hour's drive from the Oklahoma state line, and Texas does not permit casino gambling. The Indian Gaming Regulatory Act of 1988 mandates that net revenues of such gaming be directed to tribes for government, economic development and general welfare use; to charitable organizations and to help fund local governments. Approved by voters in 2004, Oklahoma's State-Tribal Gaming Act created a tribal gaming compact allowing federally recognized American Indian tribes to operate, electronic bonanza-style bingo games, electronic amusement games, electronic instant bingo games and non house-banked card games. The current compact automatically renews on Jan. 1, 2020. The Oklahoma Indian Welfare Act allowed any recognized tribe in Oklahoma to be federally incorporated, have the right to self-determination and make their own bylaws.

=== South Dakota ===
Tribal gaming in South Dakota is regulated through tribal-state compacts negotiated with individual tribes, with the oversight of the South Dakota Commission on Gambling. Casino games in Class II and Class III are permitted. Sports betting is legal in tribal casinos but mobile sports betting is not currently allowed. Among the 12 tribal casinos operated by 7 South Dakota Native American tribes, the Sioux-owned Royal River Casino in Flandreau is the largest, featuring 400 slot machines, a dozen gambling tables, and two restaurants.

=== Wyoming ===
The development of Indian gaming in Wyoming experienced significant challenges. The Northern Arapaho Tribe, after several unsuccessful attempts to negotiate a compact with the state, initiated a lawsuit in federal court. Their claim was rooted in the assertion that Wyoming's refusal to negotiate constituted bad faith, especially considering that the Indian Gaming Regulatory Act (IGRA) of 1988 permitted casino-style gaming on tribal lands, as such gaming was already allowed within Wyoming for fundraising purposes.

In 2005, a pivotal court decision favored the Northern Arapaho Tribe, granting them the right to offer comprehensive casino-style Class III gambling on their lands. This ruling was a consequence of Wyoming's actions, which ultimately led to the state forfeiting any claim to revenue sharing from Class III gaming income generated by the tribe.

Following this judicial outcome, in May 2006, Wyoming Governor Dave Freudenthal and the Eastern Shoshone Tribe entered into the state’s first Class III gaming compact. This agreement, negotiated in April 2006, was made possible after the 10th Circuit Court of Appeals affirmed that all types of Class III gaming were accessible to tribes within the state. Both the Northern Arapaho Tribe and the Eastern Shoshone Tribe have since operated casinos near their shared Wind River Indian Reservation.

In Wyoming, while there are no commercial casinos, tribal gaming is conducted by the Eastern Shoshone and the Northern Arapaho Tribes with casinos located on the Wind River Indian Reservation in Fremont County near Lander and Riverton. The Eastern Shoshone Tribe operates under a state compact, while the Northern Arapaho Tribe's gaming activities are authorized by the National Indian Gaming Commission (NIGC). When interacting with these tribes for business purposes, it is crucial to adhere to each tribe’s specific policies and procedures, as well as any additional tribal laws or regulations.

== Impact on Native American economics ==
Native American gaming has, in some instances, changed the face of tribal economies, but it has also proven to be very ineffective in other situations. Although tribal victories over the governmental and cultural oppression in the 1950s yielded a dynamic transformation, economic success fell short in comparison. Unemployment was down and personal income had increased, but only a handful of tribes had made economic changes, with varying degrees of success. This was happening because, for most tribes, their lands were not economically productive, infrastructure was poor, and they were far away from prospering markets of large populations. In order to address the issue of poverty, Native tribes were required to fuel some type of economic development. Natives sold some of their tribal land to prospecting non-Natives in order to stimulate economic growth, but tribal gaming has proved to be the single largest source of income in the Native community. However, the United States government intervened in tribal affairs throughout the rise of Native gaming.

Many tribal governments have seen substantial improvements in their ability to provide public services to their members, such as building schools, improving infrastructure, and shoring up the loss of native traditions. Tribal gaming operations have not been without controversy, however. A small number of tribes have been able to distribute large per-capita payments, generating considerable public attention. Additionally, the national expansion of Native gaming has led to a practice critics call reservation shopping. This term describes tribes that, with the backing of casino investors, attempt to locate a casino off their reservation, usually near a large urban center. However, although authorized by the Indian Gaming Regulatory Act, only three "off-reservation" casinos have been built to date.

== See also ==
- Carcieri v. Salazar
- List of casinos in the United States
- Indian Gaming Association
- Mohawk Civil War
- Native American civil rights
- Tribal sovereignty in the United States
