= Bryan v. Itasca County =

- Supreme Court of the United States

Argued April 20, 1976 Decided June 14, 1976
- Full case name: Russell Bryan v. Itasca County, Minnesota
- Citations: 426 U.S. 373 (more) 96 S. Ct. 2102; 48 L. Ed. 2d 710; 1976 U.S. LEXIS 61

Case history
- Prior: Bryan v. Itasca County, 228 N.W.2d 249 (Minn. 1975).

Holding
- Minnesota did not have the right to assess a tax on the property of an Indian living on tribal land absent a specific Congressional grant of authority to do so

Court membership
- Chief Justice Warren E. Burger Associate Justices William J. Brennan Jr. · Potter Stewart; Byron White · Thurgood Marshall; Harry Blackmun · Lewis F. Powell Jr. William Rehnquist · John P. Stevens

Case opinion
- Majority: Brennan, joined by unanimous

Laws applied
- 28 U.S.C. § 1360

Bryan v. Itasca County, 426 U.S. 373 (1976), was a landmark case in which the Supreme Court of the United States held that a state did not have the right to assess a tax on the property of a Native American (Indian) living on tribal land absent a specific Congressional grant of authority to do so.

The case arose when a Minnesota county taxed an Ojibwe couple's mobile home located on a reservation. The Court ruled that the state did not have the authority to impose such a tax or, more generally, to regulate behavior on the reservation. Bryan has become a landmark case that has led to Indian gaming on reservations and altered the economic status of almost every Indian tribe. Later decisions, citing Bryan, ruled that Public Law 280 allows states to enact prohibitions, or crimes, that would apply on reservations, but could not impose regulations on conduct that was otherwise allowed. The case has also called into question the ability of the states to impose any sort of regulations on tribal reservations, such as labor standards and certain traffic regulations.

== Background ==
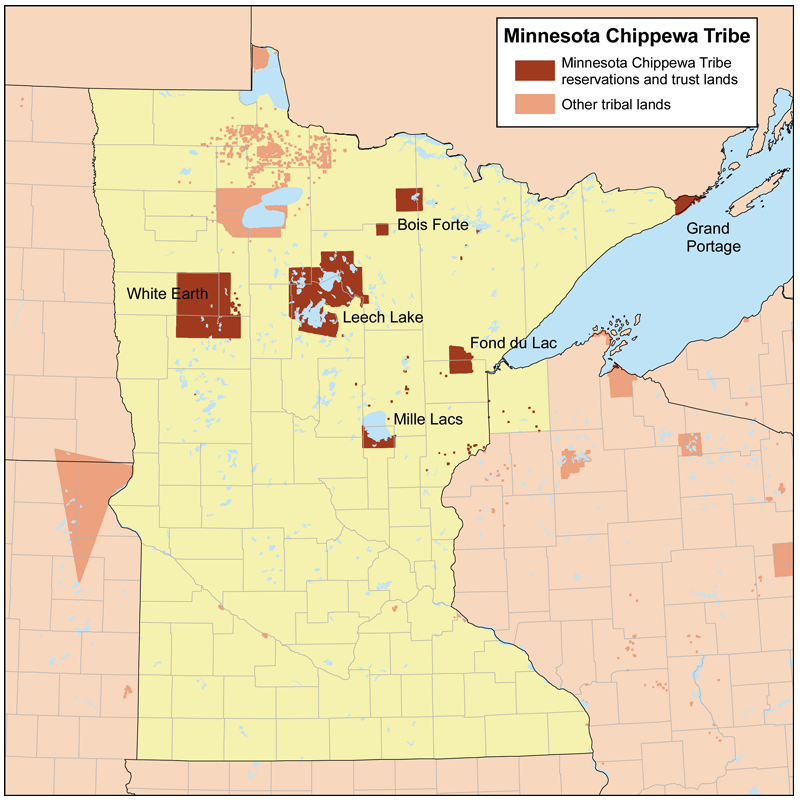
Chippewa tribal lands in Minnesota

=== Background information ===
Generally, no state has the authority to tax an Indian tribe or an individual Indian living on a reservation without authorization from Congress. This is based primarily on the Commerce Clause of the Constitution, which states, "Congress shall have Power ... To regulate Commerce with foreign Nations, and among the several States, and with the Indian Tribes." This doctrine is based on Worcester v. Georgia, 31 U.S. 515 (1832) which stated that Indian tribes are considered to be dependent sovereign nations which deal directly with the federal government, and that states have no authority to regulate or control the tribes. Congress can authorize the states to have some control over the tribes. Minnesota is a Public Law 280 state, one where Congress has granted the state total criminal and limited civil jurisdiction on tribal land and reservations.

=== History ===
Russell Bryan was an enrolled member of the White Earth Band of Ojibwe, which is a component band of the Minnesota Chippewa Tribe. He married Helen Charwood in 1957. Helen was an enrolled member of the Leech Lake Band of Ojibwe, which was also a part of the Minnesota Chippewa Tribe. They raised their children on reservation land and lived in a mobile home which they purchased in 1971. The mobile home was located on the Greater Leech Lake Indian Reservation near Squaw Lake in Itasca County, Minnesota. Bryan's mobile home, had it not been on the reservation, would have been subject to taxes from Itasca County. In June 1972, Itasca County notified Bryan that the mobile home was subject to US$147.95 in taxes. The Bryans could not afford to pay the tax, and contacted the Leech Lake Reservation Legal Services Project (Legal Services) for help, noting that the mobile home was on Indian land.

=== Lower courts ===
On behalf of Bryan, Legal Services attorney Patrick Moriarty then sued the state and Itasca County in the District Court of Itasca County, seeking declaratory relief and an injunction which would prevent the state and county from collecting taxes from Indians on tribal land. This was filed as a class action suit. There was no dispute as to the facts of the case, so the matter was submitted as a question of law to Judge James F. Murphy. In 1973, the district court held that the state and county were authorized to collect such taxes under Public Law 280. Murphy noted that while the Chippewa had at one time been a sovereign Indian nation, their members were now citizens of Minnesota and received benefits from the state such as county services, the court system, and other like services.

At about the same time as the district court made its decision, Legal Services hired a new director, Gerald "Jerry" Seck. Seck was not well versed on Indian law, so he contacted the Native American Rights Fund (NARF). With their help, Bryan appealed to the Minnesota Supreme Court. The Minnesota Chippewa tribe and the United States both filed amicus curae briefs with the court that supported Bryan's position, and NARF attorneys appeared on his behalf. In March 1975, the Minnesota Supreme Court affirmed the decision of the trial court by a unanimous decision, holding that Public Law 280 showed Congressional intent to allow such taxation. The Minnesota Supreme Court based its decision primarily on Omaha Tribe of Indians v. Peters, 382 F.Supp. 421 (D. Neb. 1974). Bryan appealed this decision, and the United States Supreme Court granted certiorari.

== Opinion of the Court ==
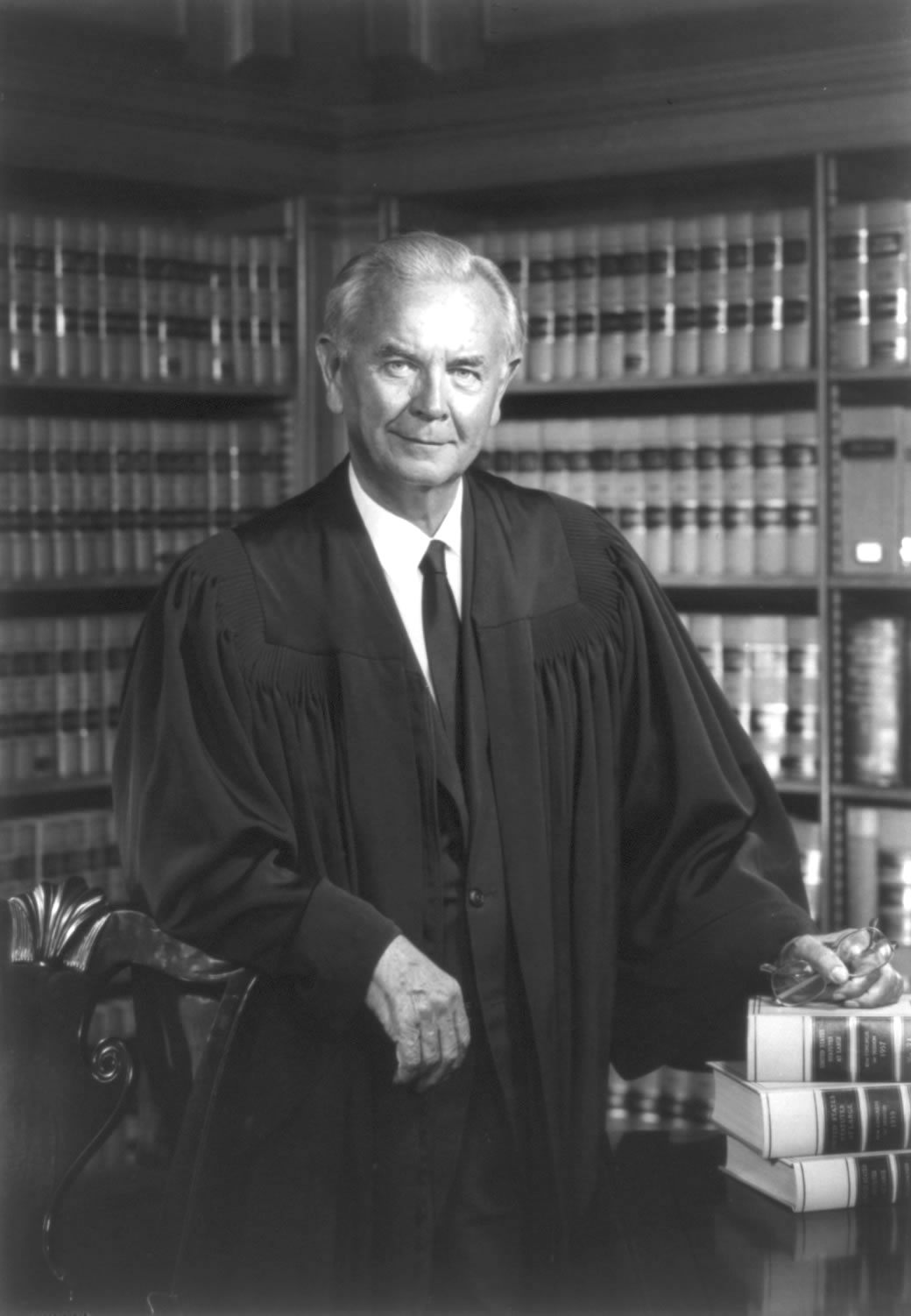
Justice William Brennan, author of the unanimous opinion

=== Arguments ===
By the time the appeal was prepared, Seck had left Legal Services but was still the attorney of record. The tribe paid to fly him to Washington, D.C. to prepare the brief with Dan Israel of NARF and Bernie Becker, the tribe's attorney who would argue the case before the Supreme Court. At oral arguments on April 20, 1976, Becker pointed out that Public Law 280 gave the state jurisdiction over criminal matters and civil "causes of actions" – a legal term for lawsuits. Since Congress had also passed other Indian laws at the same time, such as the various Indian Termination Acts, which specifically authorized states to collect taxes from Indians, its silence in this area meant Congress did not intend to do so with Public Law 280. Becker brought up the leading article on Public Law 280, by UCLA law professor Carole Goldberg, that argued that the law was established to address the problem of crime on reservations. He also noted that tribes which had adequate law-and-order processes, such as the Red Lake Band of Chippewa, were excluded from state jurisdiction in Minnesota. Arguing for the State of Minnesota was C. H. Luther of the State Attorney General's office. Luther argued four points for the tax being valid: a) the language of the statute; b) the legislative history of Public Law 280; c) prior judicial opinions; and d) public policy. Luther conceded that if the trailer was a fixed house or real property, it would be exempt from taxation. Luther also stated that other taxes – such as gasoline, sales, income and other taxes of general applicability – would apply to Indians.

=== Unanimous opinion ===
Justice William J. Brennan, Jr. delivered the unanimous opinion of the court on June 14, 1976. Brennan stated that Public Law 280 was not designed to eliminate all restrictions on the states as they dealt with Indian tribes. Brennan noted that under the Supreme Court's prior decisions of Mescalero Apache Tribe v. Jones, 411 U.S. 145 (1973) and McClanahan v. Arizona State Tax Comm'n, 411 U.S. 164 (1973), states had no authority to tax Indians "absent Congressional consent." Since Itasca County was claiming Public Law 280 granted that consent, Brennan evaluated the statute in regards to the taxation of Indians.

Brennan noted that the Minnesota Supreme Court had found that the statute did grant the right to tax personal property as an inherent power, even though the law did not specifically mention the power to tax. He rejected this argument, noting that the primary purpose of the law was to provide for "state criminal jurisdiction over offenses committed by or against Indians on the reservations." Nothing in the legislative history of the law provided support for Itasca County's interpretation. Brennan also noted that the several tribal termination acts which were considered at the same time specifically discussed the taxation of Indians, while Public Law 280 was silent.

Brennan then noted that the principles of statutory construction as regards Indians were very specific. Any differences in possible interpretation must be resolved in favor of the tribe or the Indian. Since Minnesota's interpretation did not meet any of these tests regarding either the consent of Congress to tax or of statutory construction, Brennan stated that the Supreme Court would not follow the state's reasoning, and reversed the lower court's decision.

== Subsequent developments ==
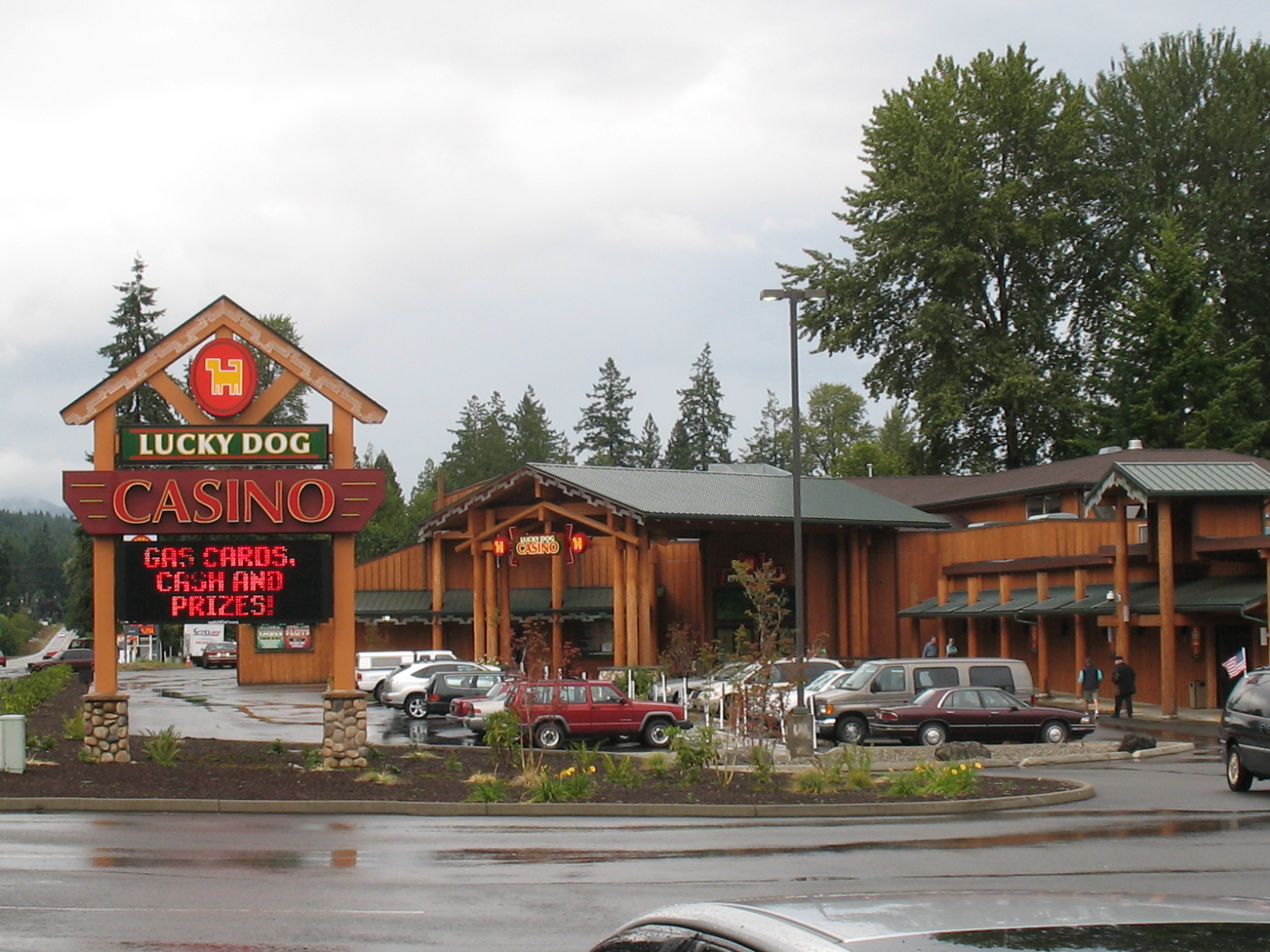
A tribal casino

When the decision was announced, it was reported as a substantial victory for Indians by both the local and national press. Bryan is a landmark case on the taxation of Indians and tribal sovereignty, having been cited over 380 times as of July 2010. The case has had a significant impact on Indian gaming with its broad holding that Public Law 280 did not confer "general state civil regulatory control over Indian reservations." This ruling in a challenge to a tax bill of under $200 had the effect of enabling Indian tribes nationwide to earn over $200 billion in gaming revenue as of 2007. The first cases influenced by Bryan involved bingo, which many states allowed, but regulated. The cases which were decided all cited Bryan in holding that the various states had no legal grounds to regulate games on tribal land. Many analysts point to the Bryan case as being the grounds upon which California v. Cabazon Band of Mission Indians 480 U.S. 202 (1987) was decided. The Supreme Court noted that California was not able to impose civil regulations against an Indian tribe on tribal land. In that case, the court noted that California not only allowed gaming, but promoted its own state lottery. Therefore, the prohibition against gaming was regulatory in nature, not criminal, notwithstanding the fact that the games were open to non-Indians as well as Indians. After the decision, Congress passed the Indian Gaming Regulatory Act to provide for a system of regulation of the Indian gaming industry.

The case is often cited to support the concept which first "coalesced" in the 1968 case, Menominee Tribe of Indians v. United States, 391 U.S. 404 (1968), that tribal rights would not be abrogated without an explicit intent of Congress to do so. It has been opined by a number of legal scholars that tribes would not be subject to state labor laws. In some instances, Bryan and Cabazon have been viewed as not allowing the state jurisdiction over the traffic violations of non-member Indians on another tribe's reservation. Bryan is extensively discussed in both major legal textbooks on Native American law and in numerous other high school and college texts.
