= Tribal–state compact =

Tribal–state compacts are legal agreements between U.S. state government and Native American tribes primarily used for gambling, health care, child welfare, or other affairs. They are declared necessary for any Class III gaming on Indian reservations under the Indian Gaming Regulatory Act of 1988 (IGRA). They were designed to allow tribal and state governments to come to a "business" agreement. A compact can be thought of as "negotiated agreement between two political entities that resolves questions of overlapping jurisdictional responsibilities Compacts affect the delicate power balance between states, federal, and tribal governments. It is these forms that have been a major source of controversy surrounding Indian gaming. Thus, it is understandable that the IGRA provides very detailed instructions for how states and tribes can make compacts cooperatively and also details the instructions for how the federal government can regulate such agreements.

== The IGRA of 1988 and tribal–state compacts ==
Section 3A of the Act includes specific instructions for the process of developing a tribal–state compact. Native American tribes are expected to request a compact with states if they should desire to have Class III gaming. (States have no jurisdiction over Class I and II gambling.) Following such a request, states are required to enter negotiations and deal with the tribes in "good faith". The original text of the act implied that if states tried to "stone-wall" tribal gambling, the tribes could look to the federal courts for support. But while the IGRA gives states unprecedented influence on tribal economic concerns, it also seeks to maintain the federal government as the "guardian" of the tribes. Accordingly, section 3B maintains the power of the federal government in this aspect. No compact will be valid until the United States Secretary of the Interior has entered the compact into the Federal registry. Also, tribes who feel that a state is not negotiating in "good faith" have the right to sue the states in federal court.

The topics that compacts may cover include provisions relating to criminal/civil laws of the tribe or state in relation to the gambling activity, the allocation of court jurisdiction between the State and Indian tribe necessary to enforce these laws, money the State should receive to defray the costs of regulating the gambling, and any other such subjects directly related to the operation of gaming activities. It also specifies that Indian tribe shall have the right to regulate gaming concurrently with the state, unless some aspect of the compact is broken.

The IGRA takes specific notice of the fact that the text is not "conferring upon a State or any of its political subdivisions the authority to impose any taxes, fee, charge, or other assessment upon an Indian tribe. This reference indicates that the Congress realized it was not following the norm of tribal governments operating independently of states.

The compacts between states and tribes have caused a great deal of controversy and the original definition of tribal–state compacts has been redefined by several court cases and congressional acts. This section will address the more prominent actions that have refined the methods of establishing tribal–state compacts.

== Balance between federal, state, and tribal government ==
Indian gambling has been the source and focus of a great deal of controversy. Part of the reason for this is the ambiguity that surrounds tribal sovereignty in the legal sense.

=== Brief history of tribal sovereignty and the law ===
Much of the current understanding of tribal sovereignty can be traced back to John Marshall and his decisions. American government has long operated under the legacy of Worcester v. Georgia, which stated strongly that the history of relations with Indians had established the understanding that tribes were "distinct political communities, having territorial boundaries, within which their authority is exclusive". However, tribes were still subject to federal regulation and laws. As Marshall had already confirmed in Cherokee Nation v. Georgia where he labeled tribes as having a ward relationship to the "guardian" national government. These decisions occurred quite some time ago, but have shaped much of the modern dealings with tribal sovereignty. There have been some exceptions made to allowing states some impact on tribes (such as Public Law 280 and crimes committed by a non-Indian to a non-Indian on tribal land), but for the most part have restricted states from interfering. When states are allowed to regulate tribal activity, there are strict guidelines to be met. On the part of federal action, the assumption is that tribes have the inherent right to govern themselves unless federal action specifically prevents an action.

=== Indian gambling and tribal sovereignty ===
The first major case to address Indian gambling and state regulation was California v. Cabazon Band of Mission Indians in 1987. In this case, the Supreme Court ruled that California did not have the right to regulate gaming unless there were criminal prohibitions against gaming in the state. Furthermore, the case set the precedent of only allowing state regulation of the tribes rarely and with federal preemption only. In denying the states the right to regulate tribal gambling, the court had essentially forced the task on to Congress. Thus, the emergence of the Indian Gaming Regulatory Act came on October 17, 1988. The act itself was an attempt to provide regulation while maintaining tribal sovereignty. The only "sticky" problem had to do with casino-style gambling. Because casino-style gambling is a "cash business" (relative to bingo) there were some who were concerned that it would attract crime (organized and otherwise). In fact, this was perhaps one of the main concerns on part of the states who were lobbying the federal government for some right to regulate gaming because of the chance of such infiltration. The tribal–state compacts came about as a compromise in concern for the casino-style gambling (Class III). The tribal–state compacts were seen as a necessary and fair political compromise by Congress, but in reality by incorporating these compacts, the IGRA seems to be illustrating a contemporary move towards devolution in some experts' opinions. Compacts do require that tribes cede some jurisdictional powers to state governments. Some may view the IGRA as a means of respecting tribal sovereignty, but in placing the necessity of compacts, the IGRA is actually establishing limitations on the authority of the tribes.

Under the original legislation of the IGRA, Congress did try to maintain the tribal sovereignty. The act created a mechanism to limit state's ability to take advantage of the tribes by allowing tribes to sue states who did not operate in "good faith". If the federal court found that states did not negotiate in good faith, it could then require that a compact be agreed upon within 60 days. If after this time had passed, the interior secretary would be assigned the task of drafting a compact- which may would most likely be a disadvantage to the states. This ability together with the requirement that the Secretary of the Interior approve all gaming compacts worked to ensure federal oversight of any state regulation- which should have softened the blow of tribal state compacts on sovereignty. In 1991, however, Seminole Tribe v. Florida upset the tribal–state balance that Congress had intended under the IGRA. This case ultimately denied tribes the right to sue states based on the Eleventh Amendment (which grants states sovereign immunity). Furthermore, the case ruled that Congress had overstepped its authority in drafting the IGRA. Seminole Tribe, then, acted to remove Congress's limited protection for tribes and removed any mechanisms for enforcing the "good-faith" clause. Experts have noted that in drafting the IGRA, Congress sought to protect the tribes, but in passing the decision in this case, the Court ignored this intention and allowed the balance of power shift in favor of the states.

=== Compacts in the wake of Seminole ===
The Seminole case greatly expanded the state power over tribal gaming. In denying tribes the right to bring suit against states, the Court did not halt the compact process, but it did destroy the only remedial scheme devised by Congress for compelling states to negotiate in good faith with their tribal counterparts. Congress had already recognized that without any way to enforce the "good faith" of states, states could simply refuse to negotiate compacts and the tribes would essentially lose its right to conduct gaming. The Court, however, did not seem concerned with this particular consequence to its decision. After the case, some states refused to negotiate, but even more demanded concessions from the tribes (sharing gaming profits among other demands). In some states, tribes had to give up treaty rights to gain receive a chance to get a compact. In Wisconsin, for instance, Governor Tommy Thompson sought to include tribes' rights to hunting and fishing treaty rights as issues for negotiations. Some states have an attempted to bring about revenue sharing, though there are strict regulations under the IGRA for this. The Court had attempted to uphold these restrictions, such as in In re Indian Gaming Related Cases the court held that a state could not violate IGRA's prohibition against the imposition of taxes and should negotiate rather than impose. However, once again in lieu of Seminole, tribes have no means by which to negotiate. Tribal gambling under the law is a dynamic issue that is still contested and there are multiple proposals for ways to fix the "gap" that the Seminole case left in the IGRA.

== See also ==
- National Indian Gaming Commission
- Gaming Control Board
