= Indian Gaming Regulatory Act =

US federal law

- Long title: An Act to regulate gaming on Indian lands.
- Acronyms (colloquial): IGRA
- Enacted by: the 100th United States Congress
- Effective: October 17, 1988

Citations
- Public law: 100-497
- Statutes at Large: 102 Stat. 2467

Codification
- Titles amended: 25 U.S.C.: Indians
- U.S.C. sections created: 25 U.S.C. ch. 29 § 2701 et seq.

Legislative history
- Introduced in the Senate as S. 555 by Daniel Inouye (D–HI) on February 19, 1987; Committee consideration by Senate Indian Affairs (Permanent Select); Passed the Senate on September 15, 1988 (passed voice vote); Passed the House on September 27, 1988 (323-84); Signed into law by President Ronald Reagan on October 17, 1988

United States Supreme Court cases
- Seminole Tribe of Florida v. Florida 517 U.S. 44 (1996); Michigan v. Bay Mills Indian Community 572 U.S. 782 (2014)

The Indian Gaming Regulatory Act (Pub. L. 100–497, 25 U.S.C. § 2701 et seq.) is a 1988 United States federal law that establishes the jurisdictional framework that governs Indian gaming. There was no federal gaming structure before this act. The stated purposes of the act include providing a legislative basis for the operation/regulation of Indian gaming, protecting gaming as a means of generating revenue for the tribes, encouraging economic development of these tribes, and protecting the enterprises from negative influences (such as organized crime). The law established the National Indian Gaming Commission and gave it a regulatory mandate. The law also delegated new authority to the U.S. Department of the Interior and created new federal offenses, giving the U.S. Department of Justice authority to prosecute them.

The law has been the source of extensive controversy and litigation. One of the key questions is whether the National Indian Gaming Commission and Department of Interior can be effective in regulating tribal economic decisions related to Indian gaming. The controversies have produced litigation, some of it reaching the U.S. Supreme Court.

== Background and precedents ==
=== Historic and cultural ===
Gambling is a part of many traditional Indian cultures. Tribal games include dice and shell activities, archery competitions, races, and so on. When Native Americans were moved to Indian Reservations in the mid- to late 1800s, most were left with limited economic opportunity. Today, most of these reservations "are located in remote areas with little indigenous economic activity .... [They] have some of the highest rates of poverty, unemployment, welfare dependency, school dropout, alcoholism, and other indicators of poverty and social distress of any communities in the U.S."

The use of gaming to generate profit did not begin until the late 1970s and early 1980s within Indian communities. Several tribes, especially in California and Florida, opened bingo parlors as a way to earn revenue. Their actions were related to the search for new sources of revenue, given the emphasis the Reagan administration placed on economic self-sufficiency for the tribes.

=== Legal ===
While bingo was legal in California and Florida, those states had stringent regulations. Operating on the history of tribal sovereignty, some tribes did not comply with these laws. High-stakes Indian bingo operations soon arose in California, Florida, New York and Wisconsin. The industry grew rapidly. State governments began contending that revenues from their own gaming operations dropped as Native American operations increased the potential stakes.

Several laws influenced the creation of the Indian Gaming Regulatory Act (IGRA). Many of these influential laws came from U.S. Supreme Court rulings regarding tribal sovereignty. While a number of court rulings played a significant role in the development of legislation regarding reservation gambling rights, two landmark cases, Bryan v. Itasca County and California v. Cabazon Band of Mission Indians, provided major legal breakthroughs.

==== Bryan v. Itasca County ====
In the early 1970s, Helen and Russell Bryan, members of the Chippewa Tribe, lived on a reservation in Itasca County, Minnesota. In 1972, the county notified them that their mobile home was subject to state property taxes. Unable to pay the tax, they turned to legal services and filed a class action lawsuit against the state, alleging that the state did not have the jurisdiction to tax personal property of Native Americans living on reservations.

According to the U.S. Constitution, the federal government possesses the sole right to treat with Native Americans. Case law has since granted Congress jurisdiction over Indian reservations. Yet, Public Law 280, passed by Congress in 1953, transferred criminal jurisdiction over Indian reservations from the federal government to certain states. Although both the district court and Minnesota Supreme Court originally ruled in favor of the state, the U.S. Supreme Court reversed this decision in 1976. The Court interpreted PL 280 more narrowly, designed to address only "crimes and civil disputes, not a unilateral grant of broad authority to states."

Therefore, states were given jurisdiction over criminal laws on reservations, but not over civil regulatory laws. This new interpretation of PL 280 opened the gates for the Indian gaming industry and led to the creation of a variety of economic development ventures on reservations. Gaming soon became the most widely successful economic initiative on reservations across the country.

==== California v. Cabazon Band of Mission Indians ====
Another court case that paved the way for the IGRA was in the mid-1980s when the Cabazon Band of Mission Indians started a small bingo parlor and card club on their southern California reservation. Although the state attempted to shut down these gambling operations, the Cabazon tribe filed a lawsuit against the state, claiming that such an action was illegal in light of prior court rulings and the sovereign rights of the reservation. The state, on the other hand, argued that running such a high-stakes gambling organization was illegal and therefore punishable as a criminal violation of law, in accordance with Public Law 280. The Cabazon case eventually reached the U.S. Supreme Court.

The "Native American cause" prevailed as California gambling laws were ruled regulatory, not prohibitory. The ruling was made because of the allowance of another form of gambling: the state lottery. This ruling plainly recognized the sovereign rights of Indian tribes living on reservations. By affirming that gambling could not be regulated by states (unless state law prohibited all forms of gambling), the Court opened the door for the Native American gaming industry.

Gambling quickly became a popular instrument for economic development on reservations striving for economic opportunity. As the growth in Indian gaming continued in the 1980s (grossing over $110 million in 1988), though, tensions increased.

States began lobbying the federal government to allow states to regulate Indian gaming. States argued that their regulation was needed to stop infiltration by organized crime. They also wanted to be able to tax revenues gained by Indian gaming. Tribes fought the states in an effort both to maintain tribal sovereignty and to protect Indian gaming revenues to support economic development. Congress responded with the set of compromises which evolved into the Indian Gaming Regulatory Act of 1988.

The primary legislators involved in drafting the Act were Senator Daniel Inouye of Hawaii, Representative and then (as of 1987) Senator John McCain of Arizona, and Representative Mo Udall of Arizona. Representative Udall had previously sponsored numerous bills regarding Native American issues and rights. At the time, Senator McCain was serving as a member of the Committee on Indian Affairs, of which Senator Inouye was the chairman. As S.555, the bill passed the United States Senate on September 15, 1988. The House passed the bill on September 27. President Ronald Reagan signed it into law on October 17, 1988.

Some aspects of the law were later clarified through court cases. Whether revenue from the Indian casinos was subject to other governmental taxation was determined in Chickasaw Nation v. United States. And, in 2009, the Supreme Court ruled in Carcieri v. Salazar that the Department of the Interior could not take land into trust that was acquired by tribes recognized after 1934.

== Three classes ==
The Act establishes three classes of games with a different regulatory scheme for each:

=== Class I ===
Class I gaming is defined as (1) traditional Indian gaming, which may be part of tribal ceremonies and celebrations, and (2) social gaming for minimal prizes. Regulatory authority over class I gaming is vested exclusively in tribal governments and is not subject to IGRA's requirements.

=== Class II ===
Class II gaming is defined as the game of chance commonly known as bingo (whether or not electronic, computer, or other technological aids are used in connection therewith) and, if played in the same location as the bingo, pull tabs, punch board, tip jars, instant bingo, and other games similar to bingo. Class II gaming also includes non-banked card games, that is, games that are played exclusively against other players rather than against the house or a player acting as a bank. The Act specifically excludes slot machines or electronic facsimiles of any game of chance from the definition of class II games.

Tribes retain their authority to conduct, license, and regulate class II gaming so long as the state in which the Tribe is located permits such gaming for any purpose, and the Tribal government adopts a gaming ordinance approved by the National Indian Gaming Commission (NIGC). Tribal governments are responsible for regulating class II gaming with Commission oversight. Only Hawaii and Utah continue to prohibit all types of gaming.

=== Class III ===
The definition of class III gaming is broad. It includes all forms of gaming that are neither class I nor II. Games commonly played at casinos, such as slot machines, blackjack, craps, and roulette, clearly fall in the class III category, as well as wagering games and electronic facsimiles of any game of chance. Generally, class III is often referred to as casino-style gaming. As a compromise, the Act restricts Tribal authority to conduct class III gaming.

Before a Tribe may lawfully conduct class III gaming, the following conditions must be met:

- The Particular form of class III gaming that the Tribe wants to conduct must be permitted in the state in which the tribe is located.
- The Tribe and the state must have negotiated a tribal–state compact that has been approved by the Secretary of the Interior, or the Secretary must have approved regulatory procedures.
- The Tribe must have adopted a Tribal gaming ordinance that has been approved by the Chairman of the Commission.

The regulatory scheme for class III gaming is more complex than a casual reading of the statute might suggest. Although Congress clearly intended regulatory issues to be addressed in Tribal–State compacts, it left a number of key functions in federal hands, including approval authority over compacts, management contracts, and Tribal gaming ordinances. Congress also vested the Commission with broad authority to issue regulations in furtherance of the purposes of the Act. Accordingly, the Commission plays a key role in the regulation of class II and III gaming.

== FBI jurisdiction ==
The Act provides the Federal Bureau of Investigation (FBI) with federal criminal jurisdiction over acts directly related to Indian gaming establishments, including those located on reservations under state criminal jurisdiction. Since the inception of IGRA, the FBI has devoted limited investigative resources to Indian gaming violations.

== The industry ==
The most recent Indian gaming statistics, provided by the National Indian Gaming Commission (NIGC), indicate there are approximately 360 Indian gaming establishments in the United States. These casinos are operated by approximately 220 federally recognized tribes, and they offer Class I, Class II and Class III gaming opportunities. The revenues generated in these establishments can be substantial.

Tribal casinos located in the eastern United States generated roughly $3.8 billion in FY02. Those located in the Central United States recorded gross revenues of approximately $5.9 billion, while those located in the Western United States generated close to $4.8 billion. Most of the revenues generated in the Indian gaming industry are from Indian casinos located in, or near, large metropolitan areas. Currently, 12% of Indian gaming establishments generate 65% of Indian gaming revenues. Indian gaming operations located in the populous areas of the West Coast (primarily California) represent the fastest growing sector of the Indian gaming industry.

There are 575 federally recognized tribes in the United States. While not all tribes will seek to establish tribal gaming establishments, it is likely that more may do so. Additionally, many of the non-federally recognized tribes are seeking federal recognition to gain access to Indian gaming opportunities and other benefits of the federal relationship.

=== Regulations ===
The Act's purpose is to provide a statutory basis for the operation of gaming by tribes to promote tribal economic development, self-sufficiency, and strong tribal governments. IGRA provides a basis for the regulation of Indian gaming adequate to: shield it from organized crime and corrupting influences; ensure that the tribe is the primary beneficiary of gaming revenues; and ensure Indian gaming operations are fair and honest for the operator and the players.

Indian gaming revenues grew from $100 million in 1988 to $16.7 billion in 2003. Since 2009, over $26.5 billion has been generated yearly. Over 220 tribes in 29 states currently conduct 350 Indian gaming operations. Although gaming has caused economic growth among many tribes, it has also become an attractive target to criminal groups who hope to profit from illegal betting, embezzlement, etc. Tribes are responsible to keep their casinos honest and under control; however, with the rapid growth of Indian gaming, federal agencies became involved in keeping Indian casinos crime-free. The IGRA also established an independent federal regulatory authority for gaming on Indian lands, federal standards for gaming on Indian lands, and the National Indian Gaming Commission (NIGC).

NIGC's headquarters is located in Washington, D.C. It is managed by a chairman, appointed by the President of the United States, and has five regional divisions. NIGC Regional Headquarters are located in Portland, Oregon; Sacramento, California; Phoenix, Arizona; St. Paul, Minnesota; and Tulsa, Oklahoma. The NIGC's mission is to regulate gaming activities on Indian lands for the purpose of shielding Indian tribes from organized crime and other corrupting influences. It also seeks to ensure that Indian tribes are the primary beneficiaries of gaming revenue and to assure that gaming is conducted fairly and honestly. In order to achieve this, "the Commission is authorized to conduct investigations; undertake enforcement actions, including the issuance of violation, assessment of civil fines, and/or issuance of closure orders; conduct background investigations; conduct audits; and review and approve Tribal gaming ordinances."

NIGC auditors and investigators ensure that Indian gaming establishments are complying with the minimum gaming standards outlined in IGRA. To accomplish this, NIGC auditors conduct yearly audits of gaming records maintained by Indian gaming establishments and, when appropriate, investigate regulatory matters. The NIGC has a major responsibility in the growing Indian gaming industry. Based on its congressional mandate, it is dependent on the FBI and/or other federal agencies to investigate allegations of criminal activity in Indian gaming establishments.

=== The National Indian Gaming Association (NIGA) ===
The National Indian Gaming Association (NIGA) is a nonprofit organization founded in 1985 made up of 184 Indian Nations, with additional nonvoting associate members. The purpose of the NIGA is "to protect and preserve the general welfare of tribes striving for self-sufficiency through gaming enterprises in Indian country," and to "maintain and protect Indian sovereign governmental authority in Indian Country." The NIGA seeks to advance the lives of Indian people economically, socially, and politically. To fulfill its mission, the NIGA works with the federal government and members of congress to develop sound policies and practices and to provide technical assistance and advocacy on gaming issues. The NIGA's office building is located in Washington, D.C. The NIGA headquarters building was purchased by a tribal collective. It is the first structure to be owned by Native Americans in Washington, D.C. NIGA is presided by Ernest L. Stevens, Jr. who serves as the chairman and by Andy Ebona acting as the treasurer.

=== The Indian Gaming Working Group (IGWG) ===
In February 2003, in an effort to identify and direct resources to Indian gaming matters, the FBI and NIGC created the Indian Gaming Work Group (IGWG). The IGWG's purpose is to identify resources needed to address the most pressing criminal violations in the area of Indian gaming. This group consists of representatives from a variety of FBI subprograms (i.e. Economic Crimes Unit, Money Laundering Unit, LCN/Organized Crime Unit, Asian Organized Crime Unit, Public Corruption/Government Fraud Unit, Cryptographic Racketeering Analysis Unit, and Indian Country Special Jurisdiction Unit) and other federal agencies, which include Department of Interior Office of Inspector General (DOI-OIG), NIGC, Internal Revenue Service Tribal Government Section (IRS-TGS), Department of Treasure Financial Crimes Enforcement Network (FINCEN), Department of Justice (DOJ), Office of Foreign Assets Control (OFAC), US Department of the Treasury, and Bureau of Indian Affairs Office of Law Enforcement Services (BIA-OLES). The IGWG meets monthly to review Indian gaming cases deemed to have a significant impact on the Indian gaming industry. As a result of these meetings, several investigations have been initiated. The IGWG through its member agencies has provided financial resources, travel funds, liaison assistance, personnel resources, coordination assistance and consultation.

The IGWG works as follows:

1. If suspected criminal activities are taking place in the Indian gaming industry and the interested office/agency does not have adequate resources to investigate this matter, the office/agency contacts the Indian Country Special Jurisdiction Unit, FBIHQ, at 202-324-3666. This contact may come from the FBI or an outside source or agency.
2. A small group of IGWG members will convene to determine if the alleged criminal violation is a matter of "national importance" in its effect(s) on the Indian gaming industry. If so, the IGWG will invite representatives from the affected FBI division, other federal agencies (if appropriate), the affected United States Attorney's office, and IGWG member agencies to meet and further review the case.
3. During this review, the agency eliciting the support of the IGWG will make a case presentation. Following a full review, the IGWG will assist the requesting office/agency to identify and obtain resources to assist in the investigation.
4. Throughout the investigation, the IGWG will assist by providing "experts" to assist in the investigation; allocating special funding (i.e., facilitating TDY travel, Title III support, special forensic examination, etc.); conducting liaison with other federal agencies; facilitating the establishment of Indian gaming task forces, and/or providing consultation.

To properly detect the presence of illegal activity in the Indian gaming industry law enforcement offices with jurisdiction in Indian gaming violations should:

1. Identify the Indian gaming establishments in their territory.
2. Establish appropriate liaison with Tribal Gaming Commission (TGC) members, State Gaming Commission Representatives, State Gaming Regulatory Agency Representatives, and Casino Security Personnel.
3. Establish liaison with representatives from the NIGC and regional Indian gaming intelligence committees. Both will provide valuable information on scams, allegations of criminal wrongdoing, and other patterns of illegal activity.
4. Make proactive attempts during crime surveys to identify criminal activity in Indian gaming establishments.
5. Send investigators and financial analysts to training which provides them with the knowledge and skills they need to effectively investigate criminal activity in Indian gaming establishments.

== Economic and social impacts ==
The overall economic impact of the IGRA on American Indian communities remains unclear. According to Census Bureau data, the inflation-adjusted income of Native Americans living on reservations grew by 83 percent from 1970 to 2000. Although much of this growth was stimulated by federal support in the 1970s, such support faded in the 1980s and 90s.

According to the U.S. Census, 24 percent of American Indian families were living in poverty in 1979. Ten years later, following the passing of the IGRA, American Indian poverty rates were at 27 percent. Similarly, the 2010 Census estimated that 26.6 percent of American Indians were below poverty level, the highest of any ethnicity. In 2011, the Government Accountability Office (GAO) reported that of over 4 million Native American citizens, nearly 30 percent are living in poverty, often lacking basic infrastructure.

Likewise, Native Americans continue to have the highest unemployment rates of any ethnicity in the U.S. According to the earliest report by the Bureau of Indian Affairs in 1982, the unemployment level of American Indians living on or near a reservation was about 31 percent. In 1987, just prior to the IGRA, unemployment was 38 percent. By 1989, the year following the enactment of the IGRA, it had increased to 40 percent. The most recent BIA report from 2005 found American Indian unemployment at a staggering 49 percent. The 2010 U.S. Census reported unemployment of Native Americans (including those living both on and off reservations) and Alaskan Natives to be 17.9 percent, tied with African American unemployment as the highest of any race in the U.S.

== Tribal sovereignty ==
The issue of Native American sovereignty has been debated for over 200 years. Chief Justice John Marshall stated that Native American tribes are "domestic dependent nations under the umbrella of U.S. government protection." The IGRA's goals—strong tribal government, self-sufficiency, and economic development—greatly affect sovereignty issues today. Tribes, state governments, the federal government, and businesses disagree about who should be given regulatory power over the thriving Indian gaming industry. To understand the issues of gaming regulatory power and sovereignty, both state and tribal rights must be considered.

=== State rights ===
Wayne Stein, professor of Native American Studies at Montana State University, says that the purpose of states is to benefit their citizens, especially in economic matters. According to his article titled "Gaming: The Apex of a Long Struggle", states are likely the largest "opponent of Indian nations, their governments, and their new efforts in the gaming world." States, likely concerned about their own interests, receive criticism for taking a stance that opposes tribal sovereignty. Stein argues that Native Americans are still state citizens, regardless of tribal affiliation, and therefore, like any other state citizen should be benefitted by the state.

Because Native Americans are technically part of a state, they are required to pay federal and state income taxes. The only exception is when an Indian both works and lives on a reservation. In that case, Indians are exempt from state income taxes. Native Americans are likewise exempt from paying state taxes on gaming revenue. Recognizing that they are missing out on untaxed revenue, states often try to gain more control over Indian gaming.

Individual states have protested their own lack of control over gaming. Some even cite the Tenth Amendment—the right for states to have all other powers not specifically designated to the federal government—to fight against gambling. Others feel the federal government is forcing states to enter into unfair gaming-related compacts with Native American tribes. A few states, like Utah and Hawaii, do not permit gambling or casinos. State officials, in general, do not believe Native Americans should be exempt from state laws.

Another reason why states argue they have a right to regulate gaming has to do with negative effects associated with gambling. Gambling, in general, has been known to lead to "compulsive addiction, increased drug and alcohol abuse, crime, neglect and abuse of children and spouses, and missed work days." Those problems affect communities near Indian casino establishments. Many believe that because states are forced to deal with the negative consequences of Native American gaming, states should have greater power to regulate the Indian gaming industry.

=== Tribal rights ===
The other side of the issue—tribal rights—also carries important points of consideration. Native American tribes enjoy a limited status as sovereign nations but are legally considered as "domestic dependent nations" as opined by the Marshall Court in 1829. Native Americans have always had difficulty finding a source of steady income. Traditional Native American ways of life had been taken away, and so a new way to be economically independent was needed. Widespread poverty among Native Americans continues today, nearly two hundred years later. Gaming is one way to alleviate this poverty and provide economic prosperity and development for Native Americans. Naomi Mezey, a professor of law and culture at Georgetown, argues that as Native American gaming regulations currently stand, the IGRA fails to provide Indians with economic independence. The act forces tribes to depend on both federal and state governments. Many Native Americans give up rights in order to receive government financial assistance. "The federal entitlement of Native Americans to game on tribal lands does not implicate economic development policy and wealth distribution alone. By redistributing culture and sovereignty, the IGRA has fueled the tribe's long battle from cultural survival and political autonomy."

== Opposition ==
The IGRA has proven to be a major focus of the controversy surrounding Indian gambling. The controversy and concerns come from the following three main areas: (1) tribal–state compacts (2) negative public reaction, and (3) gambling competition.

Tribal–State Compact is a form of cooperation commonly used in Class III gambling. These compacts affect the balance of power between states, federal, and tribal governments. Although the compact must receive final approval from the U.S. Secretary of the Interior, the compact demonstrates a state's ability to regulate and even tax Class III tribal gaming within its borders. In addition, compacts often include language relating to a state's right to enforce criminal and civil law and prosecution for gambling-related crimes. This right may conflict with tribal law enforcement jurisdictions and legal procedures. Since enforcing gambling-related laws requires resources, states ensure the compact includes language requiring tribes to financially compensate the state for regulation and law enforcement. As problems often arise because of compacts, the IGRA seeks to carefully define what compacts entail.

Some public voices oppose the current practice of government. One reason for the opposition is that the Bureau of Indian Affairs allocates taxpayer funds to tribes for economic development. Some tribes use that money to build casinos and other gaming establishments. Certain citizens reject the idea of using taxpayer money to build tax-exempt tribal casinos, which generate tax-exempt revenues. Another complaint from other U.S. citizens is the negative effects casinos have on nearby neighborhoods. They argue that casinos increase traffic, pollution, and crime. As a result, cities find themselves bearing the cost of addressing these issues.

Because Indian casinos pose a threat to the Non-Indian casinos, a gambling competition has developed between the two kinds of casinos. Such high-stakes gambling in tribal areas and tax-exempt policy give Indian casinos great advantages in this competition. Consequently, Non-Indian casinos have lobbied the government to strengthen the regulatory power of the states toward Indian gaming.

== Proposed changes ==
Since its passage, a variety of changes and proposals have been considered, and changes are still being considered. Congress has discussed proposals to impose a moratorium on any new tribal–state compacts or on new Indian gaming operations.

The Indian Trust Lands Reform Act was introduced in 1995 and 1997, marking an attempt to deny the Secretary of the Interior the power to take additional lands in trust for Native American tribes if it were for "commercial" purposes (such as gaming). Several Congressional members have expressed concern about the lack of regulation related to revenue sharing from funds generated by gaming. The regulations and methods of Indian gaming are still evolving and changing.

== See also ==
- Gambling in the United States
- Gaming law
