= Morongo Casino, Resort & Spa =

Casino in California

Coordinates: 33.9200°N 116.7950°W

Morongo Casino Resort and Spa

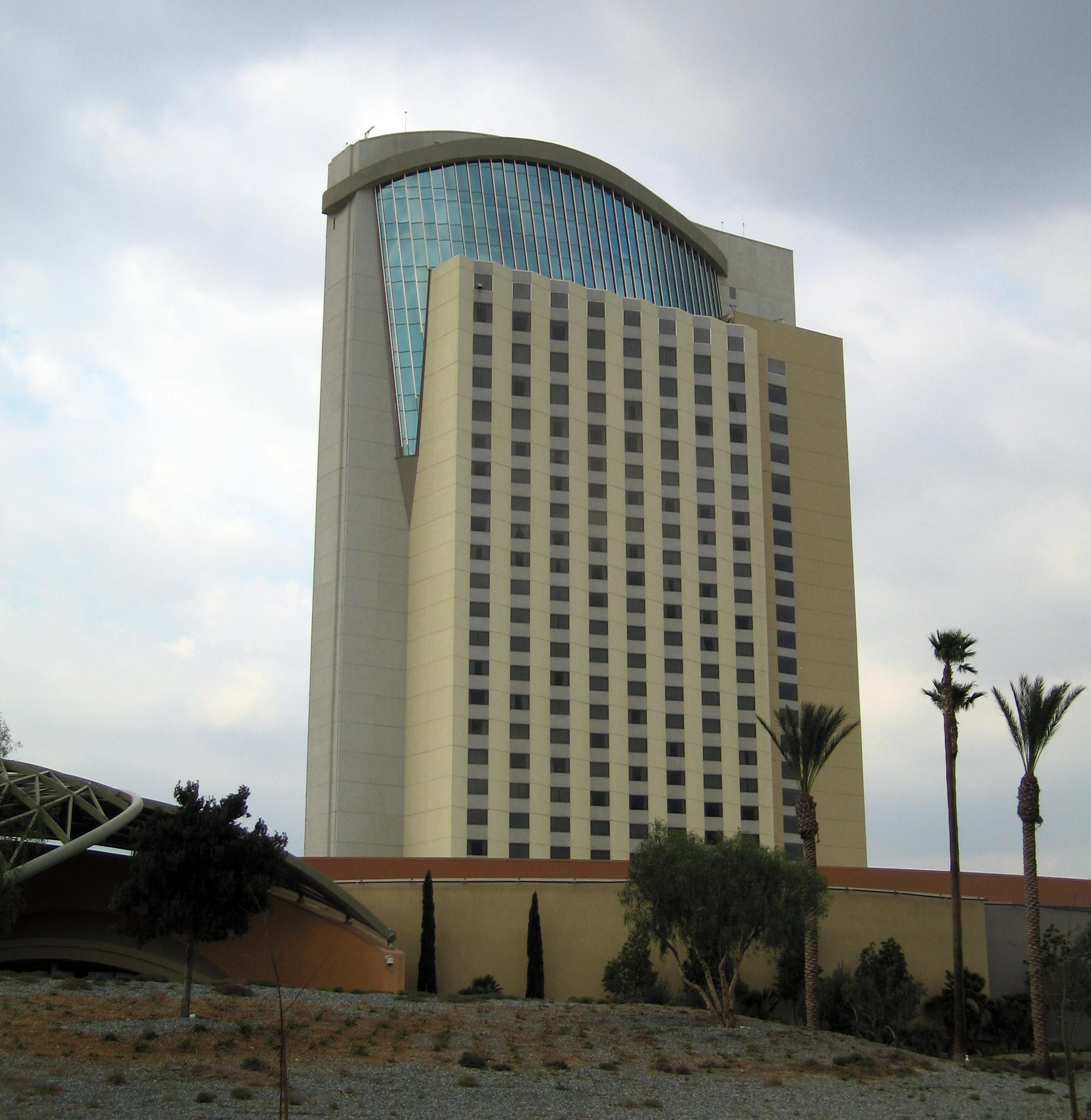
- The exterior of the Morongo Casino Resort.
- Interactive map of Morongo Casino Resort and Spa
- Location: 49500 Seminole Drive Cabazon, California 92230-2200
- Opened: December 10, 2004
- Theme: Native American Casino
- No. of rooms: 2000
- Gaming space: 150,000 sq ft (14,000 m^{2})
- Signature attractions: Canyon Lanes Bowling; Vibe Nightclub; Mystique Entertainment
- Notable restaurants: Potrero Canyon Buffet; Cielo; Serrano; Sunset Bar & Grill; Food Court; Mystique; Pit Bar; Tacos & Tequila; Natural 9 Noodle Company
- Casino type: Land
- Owner: Morongo Band of Cahuilla Mission Indians
- Website: www.morongocasinoresort.com

Morongo Casino, Resort & Spa is an integrated resort, owned and operated by the Morongo Band of Cahuilla Mission Indians, located in Cabazon, California, United States, near San Gorgonio Pass. The resort has 310 rooms and suites. A 44-acre (180,000 m^{2}), 27-story resort, Morongo is one of the largest casinos in California. At 330 feet (101 m) high, the casino tower is the tallest building in both Riverside County and the larger Inland Empire region.

== History ==
Entrance to the resort during the evening

On February 25, 1987, the U.S. Supreme Court decided that neither the state of California nor Riverside County could regulate the bingo and card game operations of the Cabazon Band of Mission Indians and the Morongo Band of Mission Indians. California v. Cabazon Band of Mission Indians set in motion a series of federal and state actions–including two ballot propositions–that dramatically expanded tribal casino operations in California and other states. In 1995, a new building was constructed for the bingo and card games, and slot machines were introduced. The new casino was called Casino Morongo and included a dance hall, bowling alley, and diner.

California Proposition 1A, also known as the Gambling on Tribal Lands Amendment, was on the March 7, 2000, ballot in California, where it was approved with a 64% win. It authorized the governor to negotiate compacts with federally recognized Indian tribes on Indian lands in California to operate slot machines, lotteries and banking and percentage card games, subject to legislative ratification.

The Jerde Partnership announced the official groundbreaking for the Morongo Hotel on May 28, 2003. Perini Building Company topped-out the resort on March 31, 2004. The $250-million Morongo Casino, Resort & Spa, which opened on December 10, 2004, is one of the largest tribal gaming facilities in the nation. Casino Morongo closed for gaming in 2004, and reopened in 2018 as a separate casino due to an expansion project at the larger casino, displacing 300 slot machines.

== Facilities ==
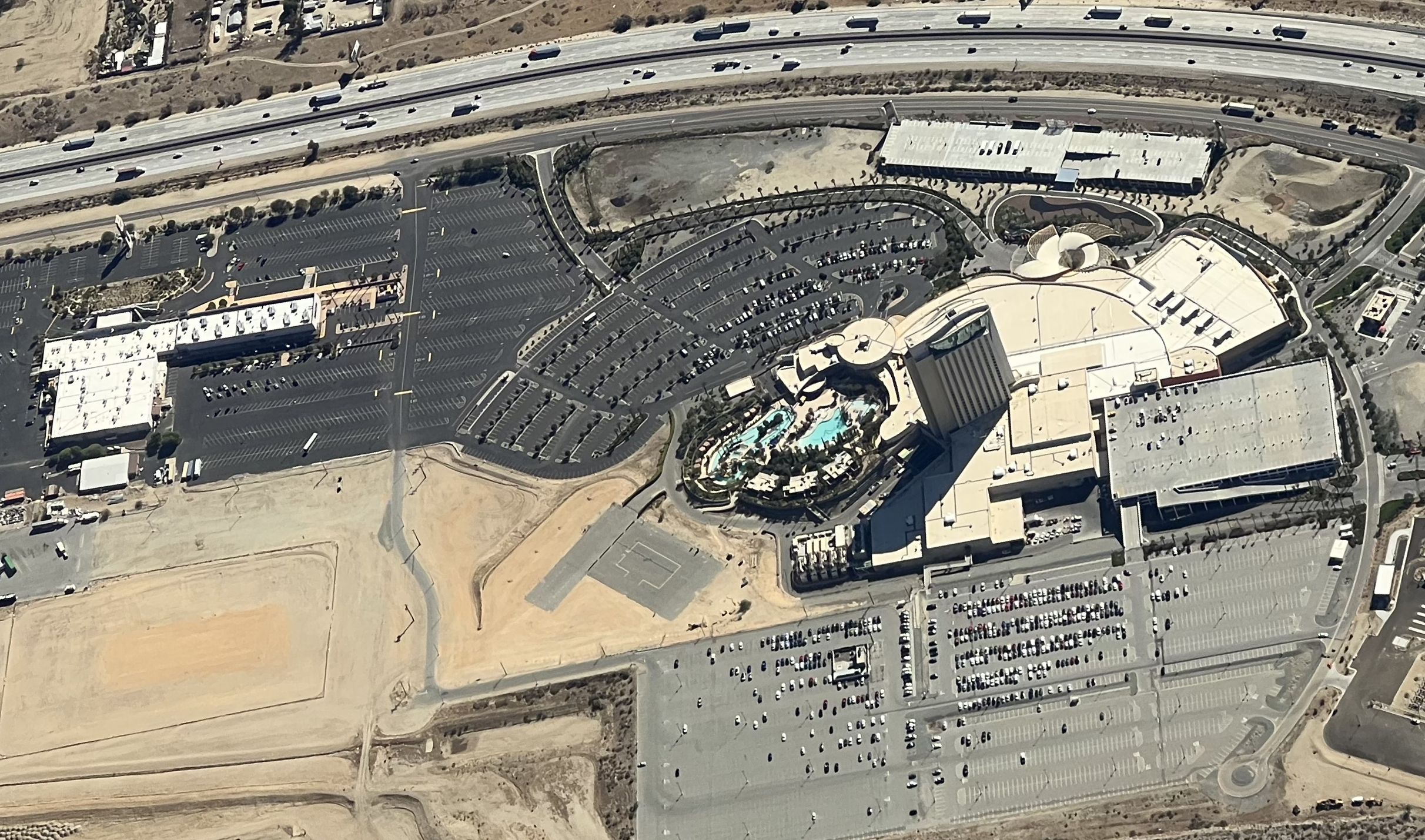
Aerial view of Morongo Casino, Resort & Spa (2021)

Morongo is one of only six AAA four-diamond casino resorts in California, with Barona Casino, Viejas Casino, Pechanga Resort and Casino, Thunder Valley Casino Resort and the Chumash Casino Resort being the others.

=== Casino ===
Morongo's main casino floor is 148,000 square feet (14,000 m^{2}) with over 2,000 slots and table games.

Upon entering the casino, guests see a contemporary, retro-1960s interior. Light coves between overhead vaults, back-lit fabric draped between frames, and conically shaped light fixtures create a complex, ornate ceiling above the casino floor.

The casino offers more than a hundred table games, including four-card poker, Ultimate Texas Hold'Em, Mystery Card Roulette, blackjack, pai gow poker, mini-baccarat, and three card poker, as well as a 22-table poker room. High rollers can use a high-limit slot area with four table games and seven slots. The high-limit room also has a lounge with plasma TVs and complimentary food.

Guests must be 18 or older to gamble on the property.

=== Hotel ===
Morongo's hotel accommodates guests in 272 standard rooms, 32 double-bay suites, and six casitas, the latter of which are located on an upper level surrounding the pool.

=== Restaurants ===
Morongo's restaurants include the penthouse restaurant Cielo, Serrano (24-Hour Cafe), Tacos & Tequila, Sunset Bar & Grill, Natural 9 Noodle Company, and the Potrero Canyon Buffet, as well as a food court.

== Sports ==
=== Boxing ===
Boxing cards are held at Morongo Casino, Resort & Spa.

=== Mixed martial arts ===
Morongo Casino, Resort & Spa hosts MMA fight cards at the Morongo Outdoor Pavilion.

== Transportation ==
Several private bus companies offer service to the casino, as well as Amtrak Thruway buses from Fullerton station. At Fullerton, passengers can connect to Amtrak’s Pacific Surfliner and Southwest Chief. These Amtrak lines provide service to Los Angeles, San Diego, San Luis Obispo and Chicago. Passengers can also connect to Metrolink’s 91/Perris Valley Line and Orange County Line for service to Los Angeles, Oceanside and Perris.

== See also ==
- Serrano (people)
- Mission Indians
- Native Americans in the United States
- List of casinos in California
- List of integrated resorts
