= Watterston House =

Historic house in Washington, D.C., United States

- U.S. National Register of Historic Places
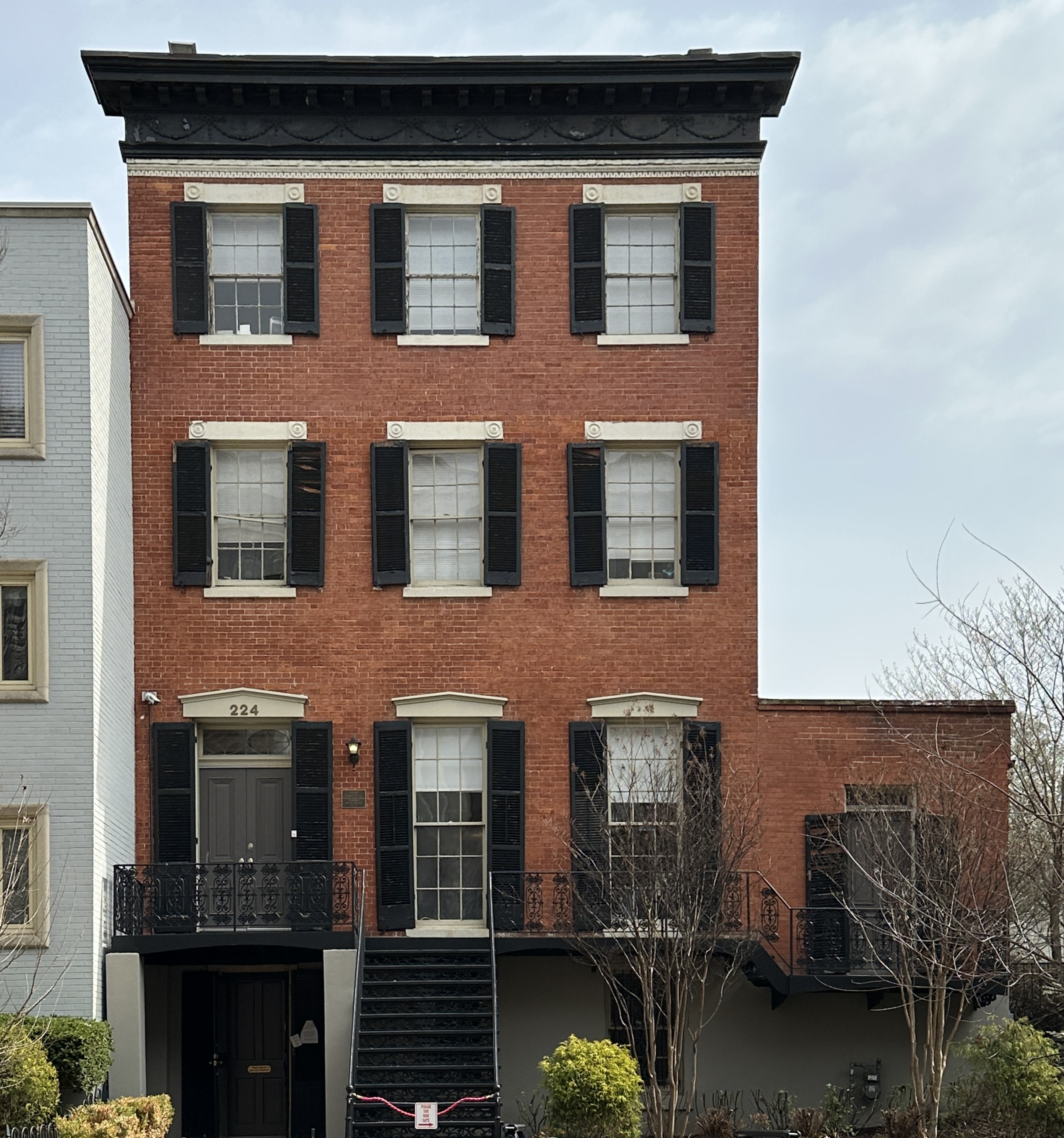
- Watterston House in 2026

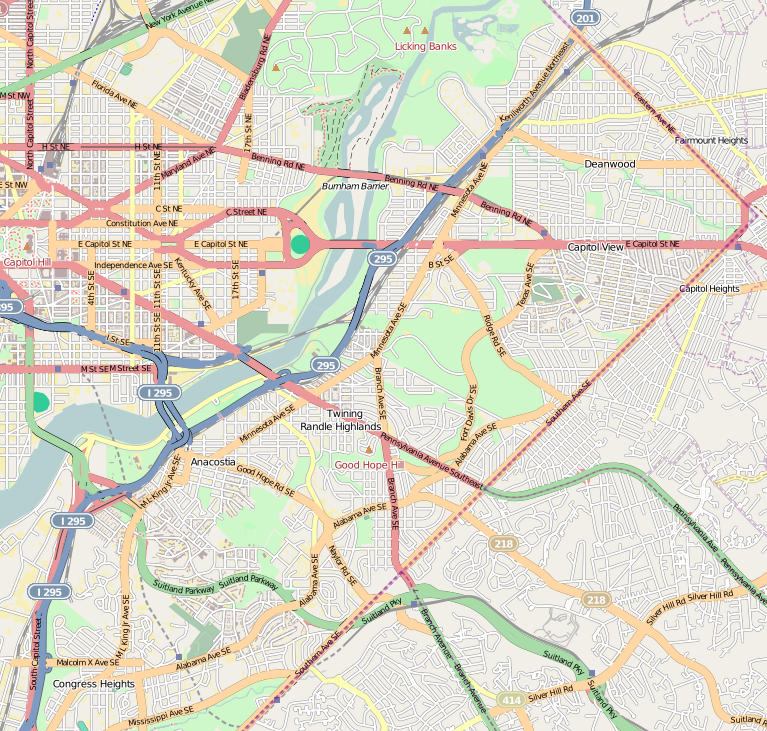
- Location within Washington, D.C. Location within the District of Columbia Location within the United States
- Location: 224 2nd Street, S.E., Washington, D.C.
- Coordinates: 38°53′11″N 77°0′13″W
- Built: 1802
- Architectural style: Federal
- NRHP reference No.: 91001942

Watterston House is a Federal rowhouse, located at 224 2nd Street, Southeast, Washington, D.C., on Capitol Hill. It was placed on the National Register of Historic Places on January 17, 1992. It was named for George Watterston, a Librarian of Congress. It was the headquarters of the Cato Institute from 1982 to 1993. It is the headquarters of the Indian Gaming Association.

== See also ==
- National Register of Historic Places listings in the District of Columbia
