= Indian gaming =

Indian gaming may refer to:

- Native American gaming, gambling activities on indigenous tribal lands in the United States
- Gambling in India, gambling activities in the country of India
- Video games in India, other types of electronic games in the country of India
