= Cabazon Band of Cahuilla Indians =

Indian tribe in California, United States

Coordinates: 33°41′35″N 116°10′22″W

Total population
- 38 enrolled members

Regions with significant populations
- United States (California)

Languages
- English, Cahuilla language

Religion
- Indigenous religion, Christianity (Roman Catholicism)

Related ethnic groups
- Cahuilla tribes

The Cabazon Band of Cahuilla Indians is a federally recognized tribe of Cahuilla Indians, located in Riverside County, California. They were formerly known as the Cabazon Band of Mission Indians.

== Reservation ==
The Cabazon Indian Reservation was founded in 1876. It occupies 1,706 acres (690 ha) located in Coachella, seven miles (11 km) from Indio, California and 18 miles (29 km) from Palm Springs. Population on the reservation is approximately 806. The Twenty-Nine Palms Reservation is located immediately to its northwest.

== Government ==
The tribe's headquarters is located in Indio, California. Douglas Welmas is their current tribal chairman.

== Programs and economic development ==
The Cabazon Band of Mission Indians introduced high-stakes bingo to their state, after they won the pivotal court case, California v. Cabazon Band. The tribe has no unemployment.

The Cabazon Band owns Fantasy Springs Resort Casino, 250 room hotel, POM Restaurant, Pizza Kitchen, The Bistro, Fresh Grill Buffet, JOY Asian Cuisine, a Starbucks, and several casual dining areas, located in Indio. The resort also featured Eagle Falls Golf Course.

The Cabazon Cultural Museum is open to the public, free of admission, Mondays to Saturdays. Since 1981, the tribe has hosted the annual Indio Powwow, with dancing, Cahuilla bird singing, drum competitions, and peon games.

== History ==
The tribe came to public attention in 1987 when they won California v. Cabazon Band; prior to the U.S.Supreme Court's decision 480 U.S. 202 (1987), the tribe had been the subject of public attention, given claims about events involving John Philip Nichols, The Wackenhut Corporation, and the June 29, 1981 triple homicides of Alfred "Fred" Alvarez, Patricia Castro, and Ralph Boger.

== See also ==
- Mission Indians

== Bibliography ==
- Eargle, Jr., Dolan H. California Indian Country: The Land and the People. San Francisco: Tree Company Press, 1992. ISBN 0-937401-20-X.
- Pritzker, Barry M. A Native American Encyclopedia: History, Culture, and Peoples. Oxford: Oxford University Press, 2000. ISBN 978-0-19-513877-1.
