= California v. Cabazon Band of Mission Indians =

- Supreme Court of the United States

Argued December 9, 1986 Decided February 25, 1987
- Full case name: California, et al. v. Cabazon band of Mission Indians, et al.
- Citations: 480 U.S. 202 (more) 107 S. Ct. 1083; 94 L. Ed. 2d 244; 55 U.S.L.W. 4225

Case history
- Prior: 783 F.2d 900 (9th Cir. 1986) (affirmed and remanded)

Holding
- Indian reservations may not engage in a form of gaming when that form is illegal in the state; conversely, Indian reservations may engage in a form of gaming when that form is legal in the state.

Court membership
- Chief Justice William Rehnquist Associate Justices William J. Brennan Jr. · Byron White; Thurgood Marshall · Harry Blackmun; Lewis F. Powell Jr. · John P. Stevens; Sandra Day O'Connor · Antonin Scalia

Case opinions
- Majority: White, joined by Rehnquist, Brennan, Marshall, Blackmun, Powell
- Dissent: Stevens, joined by O'Connor, Scalia

Laws applied
- 18 U.S.C. § 1151; 28 U.S.C.S. § 1162
- Superseded by
- Indian Gaming Regulatory Act (1988)

California v. Cabazon Band of Mission Indians, 480 U.S. 202 (1987), was a United States Supreme Court case involving the development of Native American gaming. The Supreme Court's decision effectively overturned the existing laws restricting gaming/gambling on U.S. Indian reservations.

== Background ==
The Cabazon and Morongo Bands of Mission Indians are two small Cahuilla Indian tribes that occupy reservation lands near Palm Springs in Riverside County, California. During the mid-1980s, both the Cabazon and Morongo Bands each owned and operated on their reservation lands small bingo parlors around the small town of Cabazon, California. In addition, the Cabazon Band operated a card club for playing poker and other card games. Both the bingo parlors and the Cabazon card club were open to the public and frequented predominantly by non-Indians visiting the reservations. In 1986, California State officials sought to shut down the Cabazon and Morongo Band's games, arguing that the high-stakes bingo and poker games violated state regulations. The case made it all the way to the Supreme Court before a decision was rendered on February 25, 1987.

== Arguments and ruling ==
The State of California contended that the Bands’ high-stakes bingo and poker games violated state law and requested that the Court recognize its statute governing the operation of bingo games. Riverside County additionally sought legal recognition of its ordinances regulating bingo play and prohibiting the operation of poker and other card games. California argued that under Public Law 280 (1953) Congress had granted six states – Alaska, California, Minnesota, Nebraska, Oregon, and Wisconsin – criminal jurisdiction over Native American tribal lands within the state's borders. If California's regulatory laws prohibited gambling on a criminal basis, then it is likely Public Law 280 would have given the State of California the authority to enforce them on tribal lands. However, as the Cabazon Band argued, California's laws on gambling were civil regulatory laws, and therefore the tribal lands would not in fact fall under the lawful jurisdiction of the state.

The Supreme Court held, as the Cabazon band argued, that because California state law did not prohibit gambling as a criminal act – and in fact encouraged it via the state lottery – they must be deemed regulatory in nature. As such, the authority to regulate gaming activities on tribal lands was found to fall outside those powers granted by the Public Law 280.

Cabazon had lasting implications regarding the sovereignty of Native American tribes in the United States. The ruling established a broader definition of tribal sovereignty and set the precedent that if the few states that with some lawful jurisdiction over tribal lands could not impose state regulations on reservation gaming, then no state could have such a right. Indian gaming could thus only be called into question in states where gambling was deemed criminal by state law.

== Effect on Native American gaming ==
Cabazon coincided with a period of rapid growth in the reservation gambling industry. What just years before had been a modest and relatively isolated phenomenon of reservation bingo and card games saw steady growth following the Supreme Court decision. Congress responded by passing the Indian Gaming Regulatory Act (IGRA) in 1988, which expanded the kinds of games that tribal casinos could offer, and provided a framework for regulating the industry. As part of the act, the National Indian Gaming Commission (NIGC) was formed and Indian gaming was divided into 3 classes: Class I, Class II, and Class III. Class I encompasses charitable and social gaming with nominal prizes; Class II includes bingo and other punch-board/pull-tab style games; and Class III includes high-stakes bingo, casinos, slot machines, and other commercial gaming.

As of 1996, there were 184 tribes operating 281 gaming facilities. These facilities were spread across a total of 24 states, 14 of which have physical casinos on Indian reservations. In 1995, Class III gaming revenues totaled over $4.5 billion, with an additional $300 million in revenues from food sales, hotel accommodations and other services. After expenses, this amounted to $1.9 billion in net income, $1.6 billion of which went straight to the tribes on which the casinos were operating. As of 2007, the tribal gaming industry had become a $25 billion industry generated by over 350 tribal casinos in 28 states.

== See also ==
- List of United States Supreme Court cases, volume 480
- List of United States Supreme Court cases
- Lists of United States Supreme Court cases by volume
- List of United States Supreme Court cases by the Rehnquist Court
