= Indian Gaming Association =

Indigenous American nonprofit

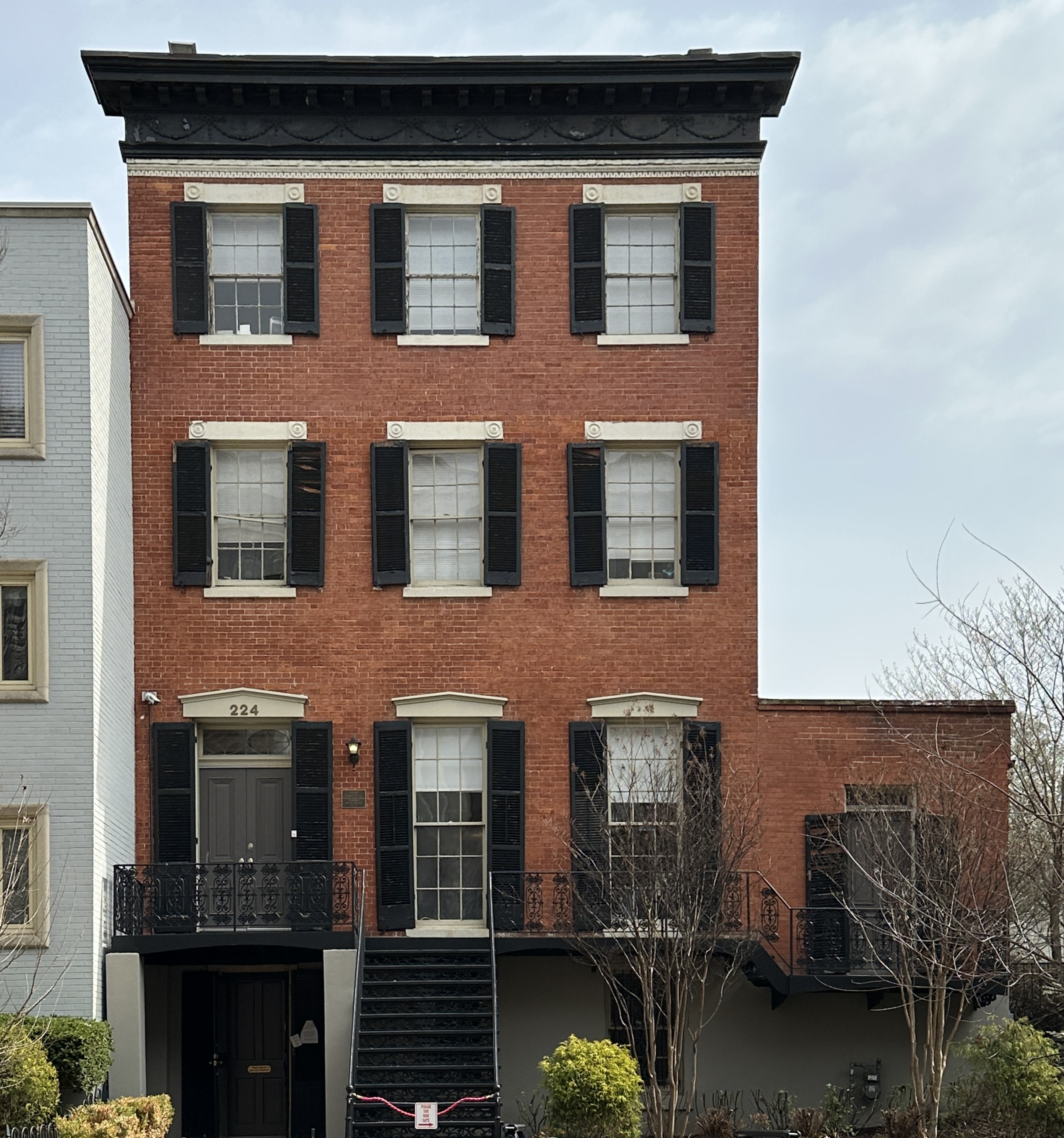
The Indian Gaming Association headquarters is located in the Watterston House in Washington, D.C.

The Indian Gaming Association is a nonprofit organization founded in 1986 made up of 184 Native American tribal nations in the United States, along with additional non-voting associate members. The purpose of the IGA is "to protect and preserve the general welfare of tribes striving for self-sufficiency through gaming enterprises in Indian Country," and to "maintain and protect Indian sovereign governmental authority in Indian Country."

The IGA seeks to advance the lives of Indian people economically, socially, and politically. To fulfill its mission, the IGA works with the federal government and members of Congress to develop sound policies and practices and to provide technical assistance and advocacy on gaming issues. The IGA's office building is located in Washington, D.C. The IGA headquarters building was purchased by a tribal collective. IGA is presided by David Z. Bean who serves as the chairman and by Denise Harvey acting as the treasurer.

The former chairman, Ernest P. Stevens Jr is one of six recipients of the "Path Breaker" award, which is awarded to individuals who have had a positive impact on Indian gaming. The former treasurer, Andy Ebona, is also a member of the Douglas Indian Association which represents the T’aaḵu Kwáan. Ebona is also vice president of Native Beverage Group, Chairman of the advisory board of Spirit of Sovereignty, and Owner of Copper Shield Consulting LLC which works with Tribes and villages on economic and community development projects.

Formerly known as the National Indian Gaming Organization, the "National" portion of the name was removed from its name in April 2022, as the organization's acronym could be inadvertently pronounced as a racial slur towards Black Americans if pronounced as a word (though the organization's own pronouncement of the acronym did not resemble said slur).

== Activities ==
On May 13, 2012, the organization held their 28th Annual tradeshow and Convention in the San Diego Convention Center where a premier showcase of Native culture was on display. In March 2019 Ernest P. Stevens Jr and Andy Ebona attended the tribal business summit in Britain in the House of Lords in the presence of the Baroness of Winterbourne. On April 3, 2019, they honored seven women elected Tribal Leaders in recognition of their commitment and leadership for their Tribal Nations and all of Indian Country.

== Website ==
- Official website
