= Public Law 280 =

Law of the United States regarding States and Native American reservations

- Long title: An Act to confer jurisdiction on the States of California, Minnesota, Nebraska, Oregon, and Wisconsin, with respect to criminal offenses and civil causes of action committed or arising on Indian reservations within such States, and for other purposes
- Nicknames: PL 280
- Enacted by: the 83rd United States Congress

Citations
- Public law: Pub. L. 83–280
- Statutes at Large: 67 Stat. 588

Codification
- Acts repealed: Act of October 5, 1949 (Pub. L. 63–705)
- Titles amended: 18 U.S.C.: Crimes and Criminal Procedure; 28 U.S.C.: Judiciary and Judicial Procedure
- U.S.C. sections created: 18 U.S.C. § 1162; 28 U.S.C. § 1360

Legislative history
- Introduced in the House as H.R. 1063 by Sam Coon (R‑OR) on January 6, 1953; Committee consideration by House Interior and Insular Affairs; Senate Interior and Insular Affairs; Passed the House on July 27, 1953; Passed the Senate on August 1, 1953; Signed into law by President Dwight D. Eisenhower on August 15, 1953

Major amendments
- Indian Civil Rights Act of 1968 (Pub. L. 90–284)

Public Law 280 is a federal law of the United States that changes legal jurisdiction on Indian lands and over Indian persons introduced on January 6, 1953 by Rep. Sam Coon (R‑OR) and became law on August 15, 1953. The law transfers some jurisdiction from the federal government to states in both civil and criminal cases in certain places. There are 574 federally recognized Indian tribes in the United States, up from 562 when the law was passed. 39% of these are in Alaska; the rest in the continental US. This law covered a little more than 300 tribes when it took effect. In 1968, the law was amended so that states had to have the consent of the tribes to assume jurisdiction from federal government. Where states had already assumed jurisdiction, jurisdiction would retrocede to the federal government if the tribes requested it. Nearly 30 tribes were involved in retrocession. Also in 1968 the Indian Civil Rights Act was passed, causing funding to begin rising for tribal justice systems. Funding increased from $1.5 million in 1972 to $10 million in 1990. In 2010, the Tribal Law and Order Act was enacted with the goal of decreasing crime against indigenous women and children.

== Transfer of federal law enforcement authority ==
The Act mandated a transfer of federal law enforcement authority within certain tribal nations to state governments in six states: California, Minnesota (except the Red Lake Nation), Nebraska, Oregon (except the Warm Springs Reservation), Wisconsin (except later the Menominee Indian Reservation) and, upon its statehood, Alaska. There are currently 6 mandatory P.L. 280 states which are the listed above. Mandatory states did not get the option to refuse the jurisdiction granted by P.L. 280 whereas the ten additional states listed below, had the option of adopting this policy. These states include, Arizona, Florida, Idaho, Iowa, Montana, Nevada, North Dakota, South Dakota, Utah and Washington. Not all of these states adopted full jurisdiction within their state. The federal government offered little assistance to either the states or tribes in the transfer of jurisdiction. Arizona, Florida, Iowa, South Dakota and Utah are the only optional states that have not receded any of their P.L. 280 jurisdiction. Optional P.L. 280 states did not need consent from tribes in order to enact full or partial jurisdiction of this law.

== Jurisdictional conflict ==
The Act added to a complex matrix of jurisdictional conflict that defined tribal governance at the end of the 20th century. In various states, local police, tribal police, BIA police, and the FBI are the arms of a law enforcement system that enforces laws of tribes, states and the federal government. The Act also added that tribe cannot put non-natives on trial, even when crime occurs on reservation land. Under the Act, states, local sheriffs and state law enforcement agencies take tribal members to state courts for prosecution in cases arising from criminal matters within reservation boundaries. But most tribal governments and pueblos have also adopted their own codes, and administer court systems to adjudicate violations of the code. In states where the Act has not been applied, Bureau of Indian Affairs (BIA) police respond to major crimes on reservations or pueblos. The FBI joins in investigations of the most serious criminal matters such as murders or kidnappings. In those states, when allegations against tribal members arise from crimes on a reservation, the United States Attorney cites violations of the United States Code in a United States district court. Tribal and pueblo police also enforce local codes in "non-PL 280" states.

The law protects individuals from dealing with federal prosecution on tribal land but with that comes less tribal sovereignty for the indigenous nations that are affected by P.L. 280. After the change in jurisdiction there were some issues that came forth from state legislation that led to less funding. When tribal communities voiced their concerns and criticisms of the P.L. 280, they were often met with hostility from states. Since tribal communities lost a majority of their funding from the federal government, the states' capabilities were stretched thin. They were now asked to perform duties out of their area of expertise with the same funding they were receiving. This led to criticism from local agencies because they were unaware of their jurisdictional duties surrounding tribal communities. With neither the state or tribal communities receiving funding for this change in legislature tribal communities began to suffer economically, which also led to an increase in crime rates.

== Impact ==
Very few research studies have been conducted to make a conclusion on the impact of the law on tribal land across the nation. There are questions about its effectiveness on criminal behavior and socioeconomic impact to the affected tribes. Studies that have been done have shown that the law has led to an increase in crime and has slowed the economic growth of some reservations. Native women and children have suffered disproportionately as victims of crime because of PL 280.

== See also ==
- Tribal sovereignty in the United States
- Indian Reorganization Act
- Indian termination policy
