= Mark O'Keeffe (horse racing bugler) =

American musician (born 1958)

Mark Owen O'Keeffe

Background information
- Born: Mark Owen O'Keeffe; November 19, 1958 (Age 68); Rockville Centre, New York, U.S.
- Genres: Concert band, Horse racing
- Occupation: Musician
- Instruments: Cornet, Trumpet, Flugelhorn
- Years active: 1987–2021

Mark Owen O'Keeffe (born November 19, 1958) is a retired American trumpet player who sounded the bugle call First call at thoroughbred, harness, quarter horse and steeplechase racing tracks. From 1987 to 1992 he was the official bugler of the New York Racing Association, performing at Belmont Park and Aqueduct Racetrack. He later held the bugler's post at Delaware Park Racetrack, Meadowlands Racetrack, Parx Racing and Casino and worked as a guest bugler at stakes meetings in the United States and Canada.

In 1997, while employed at Delaware Park Racetrack, he formed The All-Star Buglers. The group performed at the Breeders' Cup, the Belmont Stakes, and the Hambletonian Stakes. On August 8, 2003, O'Keeffe and another member, Richard Garrick, interrupted a monologue on David Letterman's late-night show with a shortened First call.

== List of race tracks where Mark O'Keeffe has performed ==
- The Downs at Albuquerque (Quarter horses & Thoroughbreds) - Albuquerque, NM
- Aqueduct Racetrack - Ozone Park, NY
- Atlantic City Race Course - Atlantic City, NJ
- Atokad Downs - South Sioux City, NE
- Batavia Downs (Harness) - Batavia, NY
- Belmont Park - Elmont, NY
- Beulah Park Racetrack - Grove City, OH
- Charles Town - Charles Town, WV
- Chester Downs (Harness) - Chester, PA
- Churchill Downs - Louisville, KY
- Colonial Downs - New Kent, VA
- Dayton Raceway (Harness) - Dayton, OH
- Delaware Park Racetrack (Thoroughbreds & Arabians) - Stanton, DE
- Emerald Downs - Auburn, WA
- Finger Lakes Race Track - Canandaigua, NY
- Freehold Raceway (Harness) - Freehold, NJ
- Garden State Park - Cherry Hill, NJ
- Gulfstream Park - Hallandale, FL
- Harrington Raceway (Harness) - Harrington, DE
- Hastings Racecourse - Vancouver, Canada
- Hollywood Park Racetrack - Inglewood, CA
- Hoosier Park - Anderson, IN
- Horsemen's Park - Omaha, NE
- Laurel Park - Laurel, MD
- Little Everglades Steeplechase - Dade City, FL
- Louisiana Downs - Bossier City, LA
- Mahoning Valley Race Course - Austintown, OH
- Meadowlands Racetrack (Harness and Thoroughbreds) - East Rutherford, NJ
- Monmouth Park - Oceanport, NJ
- Mountaineer Park - Chester, WV
- Montpelier (James Madison House) (Steeplechase) - Orange, VA
- Oaklawn Park - Hot Springs, AR
- Ocala Training Center - Ocala, FL
- Parx Casino and Racing (aka Philadelphia Park) - Bensalem, PA
- Penn National Race Course - Grantville, PA
- Pocono Downs (Harness) - Wilkes Barre, PA
- Presque Isle Downs - Erie, PA
- Pimlico Race Course - Baltimore, MD
- Pinnacle Race Course - Detroit, MI
- Radnor Hunt (Steeplechase) - Radnor, PA
- Ruidoso Downs Race Track (Quarter horses & Thoroughbreds) - Ruidoso Downs, NM
- Sam Houston Race Park - Houston, TX
- Santa Anita Park - Arcadia, CA
- The Downs at Santa Fe (Thoroughbreds & Quarter horses) - Santa Fe, NM
- Shawan Downs (Legacy Steeplechase) - Cockeysville, MD
- Suffolk Downs - Boston, MA
- Tampa Bay Downs - Oldsmar, FL
- Thistledown - North Randall, OH
- Unionville (Steeplechase) - Unionville, PA
- Willowdale (Steeplechase) - Kennett Square, PA
- Yonkers Raceway (Harness) - Yonkers, NY

== Herald Trumpet at the racing museum ==
In total, Mark O'Keeffe performed at 51 race tracks in 23 states and Canada. In a letter Thoroughbred Daily News published on January 16, 2024, he said the herald trumpet he had used at the New York Racing Association for most of his time there had been on display at the National Racing Museum and Hall of Fame for the past three years.
