= New York State Theatre Institute =

Educational theater in upstate NY (1975–2010)

New York State Theatre Institute (NYSTI) was a New York State public-benefit corporation that organized theatre education programs for young people in New York State. Its forerunner was created by statute in 1974. The Institute produced over 30 plays and musicals for family and school audiences, and provided a theatre-arts school, summer programs, and internships. The company toured within New York State and abroad. The Institute closed in 2010 following a State enquiry into alleged irregularities.

== History ==
In 1974, the New York State Legislature enacted legislation creating the Empire State Youth Theatre Institute (ESYTI) under the guardianship of The State University of New York. Its Founding Director was Patricia B. Snyder. In 1982, through a collaboration with The Egg (the Empire State Plaza Performing Arts Center) it became known as the Empire State Institute for the Performing Arts (ESIPA). In 1992, with impending closure for financial reasons, the New York State Legislature reconstituted the organization as a public benefit corporation and renamed it the New York State Theatre Institute (NYSTI). The institute later moved to the Troy campus of Russell Sage College.

NYSTI was the first state mandated theatre education program for children in the United States. The Theatre Institute's programs were piloted in 1975 at Lake Avenue Elementary School in Saratoga Springs, New York and at the Empire State Plaza MeetingRoom 6. The program officially began in September 1976 and continued on an 11-month basis until December 31, 2009. Following financial difficulties and an official enquiry into alleged nepotism and misuse of funds, the institute closed at the end of 2010.

== Mission ==
NYSTI's mission was fourfold: 1) to produce professional theatre of the highest artistic standards for family and school audiences; 2) to use those productions to provide provocative and innovative arts in education programs; 3) to exchange theatre, culture, and humanity with the people and artists of other nations; and 4) to develop new plays and musicals for family audiences.

== Methods and educational programs ==
Performers, technicians, staff, and guest artists used theatre to motivate school students to find new interest in their daily subjects. The institute's educational services included Pre-Show Intros and Study Guides, Inservices, inter-disciplinary classes following performances, educational outreach programs, a Theatre Arts School, summer theatre programs, and an extensive intern and educator-in-residence program. All members of NYSTI's professional staff participated in educational programs.

== Internships ==
Internships provided school-to-work transition experience for high-school seniors as well as college undergraduate and graduate students from schools in New York and other states, as well as from other countries. Each intern was assigned a mentor from the professional staff to guide and assist the intern. More than 1,500 interns from more than 90 colleges, high school seniors, and thirteen foreign nations worked and studied at NYSTI.

== International exchange ==
The Institute always maintained a commitment to international cultural exchange beginning with the tour of “The Wizard of Oz” to Moscow in 1974 by the troupe from the State University of New York at Albany whose leadership later founded the institute. In 1986, the Institute became the first theatre company from the United States to perform in the former Soviet Union upon resumption of cultural relations between the two countries. The company returned to Russia in 1989 and twice hosted visits to the United States by the Moscow Musical Theatre. NYSTI also represented its state and nation in cultural exchanges with Canada, England, France, Israel, Italy, Sweden and Jordan, including a month-long performance run in London's West End. NYSTI hosted more than thirty foreign artists or companies from such places as Russia, Israel, Jordan, Sweden, Scotland, Hungary, England, France, Canada, and Japan.

== New plays and musicals ==
Eight of NYSTI's premieres were accepted for licensing and publication by Samuel French Inc., the world's largest publisher of plays. Among NYSTI's count of more than forty-five premiere productions were William Gibson's “Rag Dolly,” which toured to Moscow in 1986 (a later version opened on Broadway as "Raggedy Ann") and Paul Shyre's “Hizzoner!,” starring Tony Lo Bianco, which won five Emmy awards in a WNET/13 co-production and later played on Broadway before touring to Moscow in 1989. The New York and East Coast premiere of Jeffrey Sweet's “American Enterprise,” was nominated by the Outer Critics Circle for its 1994 John Gassner Playwriting Award and chosen for special citation in The Best Plays of 1993–1994.

Warner Music Group awarded NYSTI $400,000 in 1996 to develop five new musicals for family audiences. The first of those was “A Tale of Cinderella” by W.A.Frankonis, Will Severin, and George David Weiss, made possible in part by funding provided by Warner Music Group and by the participation of Warner/Chappell Music, Inc. Warner Bros. Publications also published “Vocal Selections from ‘A Tale of Cinderella’.” The video was broadcast nationwide on PBS stations. In the 2000-01 season, “A Tale of Cinderella” toured all the major cities of New York including Buffalo, Syracuse, the Capital Region, and Manhattan.

Other new musicals developed with the Warner Music Group grant were “The Silver Skates,” “Magna Carta,” and “The Snow Queen” (which toured to London's West End and won numerous awards for its audiobook).

== National touring ==
In addition to its tour of “A Tale of Cinderella,” NYSTI toured its education programs and performances to New York City, with productions of Institute originals “Sleeping Beauty” and “Beauty and the Beast,” and new stagings of “Narnia” and “Slow Dance on the Killing Ground.” The theatre company also performed at the Kennedy Center, Ford's Theatre, Queens Theatre in the Park, the Fulton Opera House, and the Honolulu Theatre for Youth.

== Audio books ==
In later years, NYSTI, through Family Classic Audio, began producing audio books. Ten of its titles won awards from five national presenters in all kinds of genres: musicals, mysteries, and dramas. Two titles won Audie Awards from the Audio Publishers Association (“The Killings Tale,” “Sherlock’s Secret Life” and another six were named Audie Award Silver Finalists (“Hollowville,” “Sherlock’s Legacy,” “King of Shadows,” “Heart of Troy,” “Zoe Caldwell reads Oscar Wilde Fairy Tales,” “A Little Princess”). AudioFile magazine gave its Earphones Award to “A Tale of Cinderella” and “The Snow Queen.” Foreword magazine named “The Snow Queen” a finalist for its ‘Book of the Year’ award and the Independent Book Publishers Association also recognized “The Snow Queen” with a Benjamin Franklin Award. “King of Shadows,” also received a nomination for a Benjamin Franklin Award. USA Book News gave “The Killings Tale” its Best Books Award and named “The Snow Queen” a finalist.

== Controversy ==
Several years of budget cuts preceded an investigation ordered by the Executive branch of government. The investigation went on for over a year and led to a report by the New York State Inspector's Office, issued in April 2010, alleging corruption, mismanagement, nepotism and possibly illegal conduct at the theatre. It claimed that the Producing Director improperly used state money to pay herself and her family, and to subsidize trips to Europe. The institute was closed down and its statutory status was removed. The enquiry was terminated with a financial settlement in July 2011, with the charges neither accepted nor denied.

== See also ==
- Agriculture & New York State Horse Breeding Development Fund
- Empire State Development Corporation
- New York State Thoroughbred Breeding and Development Fund Corporation
- New York Racing Association
- Olympic Regional Development Authority
- United Nations Development Corporation
