= David Schramm (actor) =

American actor (1946–2020)

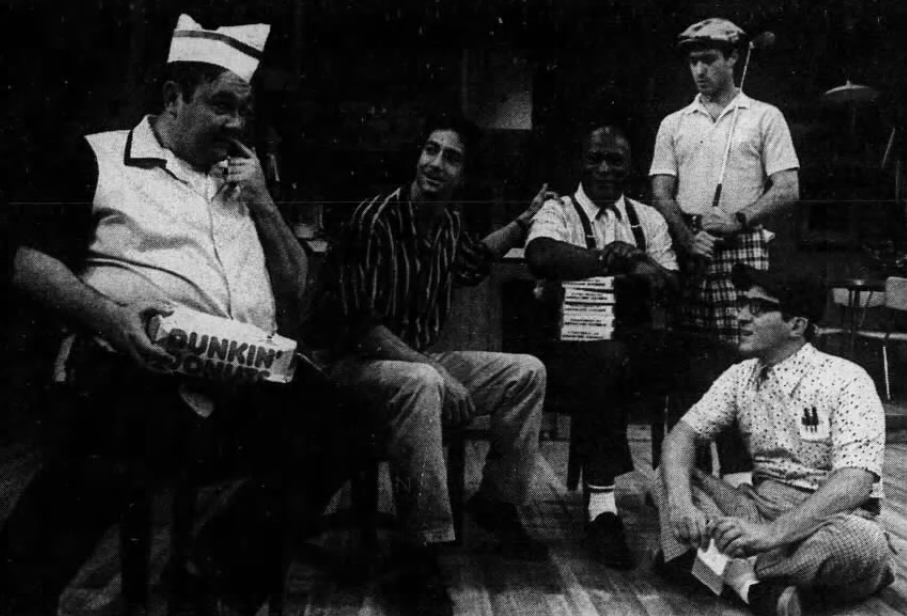
- Schramm (left) with David Strathairn, John Amos, Joe Urla and Joe Grifasi in The Boys Next Door, 1987
- Born: David Michael Schramm; August 14, 1946; Louisville, Kentucky, U.S.
- Died: March 28, 2020 (aged 73); New York City, New York, U.S.
- Education: Western Kentucky University (BA); Juilliard School (GrDip)
- Occupation: Actor
- Years active: 1973–2019

David Michael Schramm (August 14, 1946 – March 28, 2020) was an American actor. He was best known for playing the role of Roy Biggins, the curmudgeonly rival airline owner in the TV series Wings.

== Early life and education ==
Schramm was born on August 14, 1946, in Louisville, Kentucky. His father was a bookie.

Schramm revealed in a 2008 interview that at the age of 17, "(my parents) always came to see me in school, where I won trophies for speaking, and then in those big outdoor dramas we have in Kentucky, and then as an apprentice actor at the playhouse that eventually became the Actors Theater of Louisville." Schramm also earned $25 a week for cleaning toilets and for being in a play.

"I had been acting non-stop since I was a teenager," Schramm said in a 2012 interview. "But really I got started in acting because others helped me push into it. When I was a kid, it was other actors getting me to do it. Then I had a series of teachers who told me I was going to do it. John Houseman got me under his wing, and I went along with it happily."

Schramm took acting classes at Western Kentucky University, where he got a full scholarship to the Juilliard School from Mildred Howard. Schramm attended Juilliard from 1968 to 1972 and took classes that were taught by Michael Kahn. Schramm graduated from Juilliard afterwards. He is also a founding member of The Acting Company.

== Early career ==
=== Early theatre work ===
Houseman offered Schramm to play King Lear in an Off-Broadway production of William Shakespeare's play of the same name. In 1979, Schramm appeared on Broadway opposite Judith Ivey in Alan Ayckbourn's Bedroom Farce. He played the role of Malcolm.

In 1980, Schramm performed in Howard Sackler's Goodbye Fidel at the Ambassadors Theatre.

In 1985, he assumed the role of the sinister, rat-faced General D. in Raggedy Ann: The Musical Adventure (then-titled Rag Dolly) at the New York State Theatre Institute and remained with the cast the following year, when the show played for packed houses in Russia.

In 1988, Schramm appeared at the Pasadena Playhouse opposite Rebecca DeMornay in a production of Born Yesterday.

In September 1989, he performed in Ayckbourn's A Chorus of Disapproval at the South Coast Repertory.

=== Early television work ===
Schramm appeared in the television movie, The Dreamer of Oz: The L. Frank Baum Story (1990), and the miniseries, Kennedy (1983), in which he portrayed Secretary of Defense Robert McNamara.

Schramm also made appearances in Another World and Wiseguy. In 1990, he appeared opposite Sandra Bullock in the short-lived series Working Girl, based on the 1988 film of the same name. He also had a major part in Miami Vice season 5 episode 7 (Asian Cut) where he played a serial killer Professor Eric G. Halliwell.

=== Film work ===
Films he appeared in include Let It Ride (1989), Johnny Handsome (1989) and A Shock to the System (1990).

== Wings ==
Schramm gained national recognition for portraying the blustery, cantankerous airline owner Roy Biggins, in the sitcom Wings, which aired from 1990 to 1997. He appeared in all 172 episodes of the show.

When asked what he remembered most from Wings: "I knew when we started it was going to be a success. Not just because the writers had been involved with Cheers, Taxi and Mary Tyler Moore. But when we sat around the table reading the first script, and I saw this buffoon they created for me, this pompous guy who said garish things to women, and all the other rich characters, I turned to Rebecca (Schull, who played Fay) and said, 'I think we've landed in a tub of butter.' And we did. If only I put the money I made under my mattress instead of in the stock market."

== Later theatre work ==
After Wings, Schramm returned to acting on stage both in theaters across the country and on Broadway.

From October 31 to December 21, 2003, Schramm appeared in the New York Theatre Workshop's production of The Beard of Avon. He played the role of John Heminge.

In June 2008, Schramm was part of the cast of the Berkshire Theatre Festival's production of George Bernard Shaw's Candida, in which he played Candida's father, Mr. Burgess. On August of that same year he played Pozzo in Samuel Beckett's Waiting for Godot at the same festival.

From November 18 to December 14, 2008, Schramm portrayed the role of Richard Harkin in Conor McPherson's The Seafarer at George Street Playhouse in New Brunswick, New Jersey. The production was directed by Anders Cato, whom Schramm previously collaborated with in Waiting for Godot and Candida.

From October 29, 2009, to January 17, 2010, Schramm appeared in the revival of Finian's Rainbow at the St. James Theatre in New York City, portraying the role of Senator Rawkins.

In February 2012, it was announced that Schramm would appear in a stage production of Reginald Rose's Twelve Angry Men at the George Street Playhouse. The show had its premiere on March 13, 2012.

In June–July 2012, Schramm portrayed Falstaff in William Shakespeare's The Merry Wives of Windsor at The Shakespeare Theatre in Washington, D.C. "This is my first time doing Merry Wives. I'm having a great time. The director (Stephen Rayne) is absolutely stellar. He's intelligent and experienced and really knows the era. We've set the play at the end of the first World War, sort of in the Downton Abbey era. It works very well as a time period for the play. And it looks great. We're meticulously putting it together. This play really demands a lot from everybody. There's so much to try and do. But we're all pulling together," said Schramm in a 2012 interview. Schramm also revealed that it was his first time at the Shakespeare Theatre.

In October 2014, Schramm played the role of Tony in the George Street Playhouse's production of John Patrick Shanley's Outside Mullingar.

In June 2015, it was reported that Schramm was suffering from vocal problems and under doctor's orders, he had to withdraw from performing in the Barrington Stage Company's production of Richard Strand's Butler. Director Joseph Discher cast understudy Wally Dunn as Schramm's replacement for the title role.

Schramm's final stage performance was in the York Theatre Company's revival of Enter Laughing: The Musical in 2019.

== Personal life ==
Schramm resided in New York and had homes in Chatham and Riverdale. He has been credited for getting David Adkins into a career in acting when he took him to see Juilliard.

Schramm stated in a 2008 interview, "I'm not a drinker, though I come from an area where drinking is like breathing. My father was a bookie, so consequently we went to the track a lot, where there was plenty of booze. My entire family drank; on weekends, there were always plenty of cases of beer in the house. Don't ask me why, but I just didn't get that gene."

Schramm died in New York on March 28, 2020, at the age of 73, from a heart attack.

== Filmography ==
David Schramm film and television credits
| Year | Title | Role | Notes |
|---|---|---|---|
| 1983 | Kennedy | Secretary of Defense Robert McNamara | TV miniseries |
| 1984 | Another World | Herb Harris | 2 episodes |
| 1988 | The Equalizer | Joe | Episode: "Last Call" |
| 1989 | Miami Vice | Professor Eric G. Halliwell | Episode: "Asian Cut" |
| 1989 | Wiseguy | Dr. Hasburg | 1 episode |
| 1989 | Let It Ride | Lufkin | Film |
| 1989 | Johnny Handsome | Vic Dumask | Film |
| 1990 | A Shock to the System | Executive #3 | Film |
| 1990 | Working Girl | Joe McGill | 3 episodes |
| 1990 | The Dreamer of Oz: The L. Frank Baum Story | W.W. Denslow | TV movie |
| 1990-1997 | Wings | Roy Biggins | 172 Episodes |
| 1996 | Big Packages | Herb | Film |
| 1998 | Hercules | Bellerophon (voice) | Episode: "Hercules and the Pegasus Incident" |
