= Raggedy Ann (musical) =

- The Musical Adventure
- Poster by Peter Georgeson
- Music: Joe Raposo
- Lyrics: Joe Raposo
- Book: William Gibson
- Productions: 1984 ESIPA; 1985 ESIPA; 1986 Moscow, Russia; 1986 Kennedy Center; 1986 Broadway

Raggedy Ann: The Musical Adventure (also known as Rag Dolly: The Raggedy Ann Musical or Raggedy Ann: The Musical With a Heart) is a musical with book by William Gibson and songs by Joe Raposo. It is based on the children's stories by Johnny Gruelle and the 1977 feature film Raggedy Ann & Andy: A Musical Adventure. The story centers on Marcella, a dying young girl whose toys come to life and take her on a magical adventure to meet the Doll Doctor, in hopes that he can mend her broken heart. Although the show failed on Broadway, it developed a cult following through bootleg recordings.

== Plot ==
The story, in the Broadway production, was as follows:

=== Act I ===
Young Marcella is suffering from psychological trauma. Her mother ran away with another man, which drove her father to drink. Her dog tried to eat her pet bird, which killed them both ("Gingham and Yarn"). In Marcella's bedroom, a trio of doctors give differing but equally dire warnings regarding the youngster's ailments until Poppa throws them out. Lightening the mood, Poppa presents her with a doll that he created, which he names Raggedy Ann. Marcella complains that she has no heart, so Poppa pulls a candy heart from a box and stitches it onto the doll. He sings his daughter a lullaby, claiming that her toys spring to life when she's asleep ("Carry On").

Marcella's bed whirls around, and out from the covers pops Raggedy Ann. The girl says she's dying, and the trio of doctors emerge from beneath the mattress to corroborate her story ("Diagnosis"). Raggedy Ann shouts them off and urges Marcella to get out of bed, revealing that this is a dream, so she can do anything she wants. The rag dolly calls for help from her friends: Raggedy Andy, Baby, and Panda, who emerge from the toy box one by one ("The Light").

Andy is curious as to what's behind the closet door, so he opens it despite Marcella's pleas. General D. emerges with his cronies, the sexy Bat and the roguish Wolf. He says that he's enlisting recruits for his Army of the Dead and thinks Raggedy Ann is the one he's looking for, but she argues that she's only "Make Believe". The General learns that Marcella is dying, so he declares that he'll be back to collect her at 6 a.m.

Suddenly, Marcella and the toys find themselves at the Miami shipyard, where old toys go to die. The doctors appear and drop the Camel behind a chain-link fence ("Diagnosis (Reprise)"). The animal tells the toys that he's all alone and "Blue". Raggedy Ann suggests that they should head to Los Angeles to visit the Doll Doctor. Andy leads them in transforming the bed into a boat, and they set sail ("Make Believe Reprise").

A giant hand sporting a thumb ring attempts to drag the boat down to Davy Jones' Locker, so the toys begin flapping the bed's blankets like wings and rise into the heavens ("Something in the Air"/"So Beautiful"). Along the way, Marcella reunites with her pet bird ("A Heavenly Chorus") and her parents ("The Shooting Star"). The Rat in the Rolls-Royce, representing the man her mother ran away with, jumps out to steal Mommy away, so Poppa punches him out, and the couple agree to remarry ("The Wedding"). Marcella says that she's tired of pointless stories and walks off, which fills Raggedy Ann with self-doubt, though the rag doll refuses to give up ("Rag Dolly"). Bat gnaws through the rope tethering them to the clouds, and the boat plunges from the sky.

=== Act II ===
Marcella and the dolls land on the roof of a meatpacking plant in Omaha and have only four hours left to get to the Doll Doctor. Bat talks Raggedy Andy into handing over the map ("You'll Love It").

General D. arrives and commands Marcella to look at his opal thumb ring. He states his intention to make Marcella his queen. The toys lull the General and his cronies to sleep ("Would You Like a Little Music?") and steal the ring. The melody fills the Camel with such spirit that he's able to soar on the wings of the song, so everyone grabs on, and they float away. The General awakens and orders Bat to follow them, but Bat refuses, so the General throws her down a chimney and sends Wolf to find the dolls instead.

The toys find themselves separated in the Grisley Woods National Park and frantically search for one another through a maze of trees littered with skeletons with glowing red eyes ("Gone"). They meet the Witch, dressed like a 1920s flapper ("Why Not?"). The Witch pulls a bundle of clothesline from her bag and tries to fashion a noose. Raggedy Ann tells the Witch that it's a terrible idea to kill herself, and the Witch reflects on the life that she gave up ("What Did I Lose"/"Somewhere"). The Witch reveals that she had a daughter named Marcella and comes to realize that the young lady standing before her is her child. They have a tearful reunion, which is interrupted by the arrival of Wolf. Bitter toward his master for killing Bat, he allows Marcella to escape but pursues the Witch into the woods.

The toys arrive at the Doll Hospital ("Welcome to L.A."), but the doctors are revealed to be the same "quacks" as before ("Diagnosis (Reprise)") and tell them the Doll Doctor is dead. Panda suggests looking into the ring, where they see the head doctor alive and chained up. General D. emerges from the cellar and declares that this is his field hospital for the terminally wounded ("I Come Riding"). He becomes curious about the heart on Raggedy Ann's apron, but upon touching it, he collapses, crying that he's been poisoned by love. They tie up the General, swipe his keys, and head downstairs. He vows that he'll get loose.

In the dungeon, the Doll Doctor examines Marcella, declaring that the "chick" has a broken heart. Upon hearing her father's pet name for her, Marcella realizes that the Doll Doctor is actually Poppa. Poppa says that a heart transplant is the only thing that can save her, but those haven't been invented yet, so he suggests a candy heart. Just as the General bursts in to collect Marcella, Raggedy Ann sacrifices her own candy heart, which she coerces the girl to eat ("The Light (Reprise)"). Raggedy Ann then leaves with the General, who is satisfied he was right all along.

Back in her bedroom, a now-healthy Marcella tells Poppa of her adventure, and he offers to sew a new heart on Raggedy Ann's chest ("Gingham and Yarn Reprise").

== Musical numbers ==
For the 1986 Broadway production.

Act I

- "Overture" – Orchestra
- "Gingham and Yarn" – Company
- "Carry On" – Poppa
- "Diagnosis" – Doctors
- "The Light" – Marcella and Dolls
- "Make Believe" – Raggedy Ann & General D.
- "Blue" – The Camel & Raggedy Ann
- "Make Believe (Reprise 1)" – Raggedy Ann, Marcella, Dolls & Company
- "Make Believe (Reprise 2)" – Raggedy Ann & Marcella
- "Something in the Air" – Company
- "Delighted"† – Clouds
- "So Beautiful" – Raggedy Ann, Marcella & Clouds
- "A Heavenly Chorus" – Yellow Yum-Yum
- "The Shooting Star" – Mommy, Poppa, and The Rat in the Rolls-Royce
- "The Wedding" – Company
- "Rag Dolly" – Raggedy Ann

Act II

- "Gingham and Yarn (Reprise 1)" – Company
- "You'll Love It" – Bat, Raggedy Andy & the Batettes
- "A Little Music" – Marcella, Raggedy Ann and Dolls
- "Gone" – Dolls & Company
- "Why Not?" – Mommy
- "What Did I Lose?" – Mommy
- "Somewhere" – Raggedy Ann
- "Welcome to L.A." – Nurses
- "Diagnosis (Reprise)" – Doctors
- "I Come Riding" – General D.
- "Gingham and Yarn (Reprise 2)" – Company
- "Rag Dolly (Finale)" – Cast

† While "Delighted" is listed on the track list for the Oct. 13th preview playbill, the song seems to be missing from known recordings of the Broadway production, as well as one of the scripts determined to be the most recent.

== Casts ==
Role	1984 ESIPA	1985 ESIPA/1986 Moscow	1986 Broadway
Doctors	William McClary, Scott Alan Evans, Gary O. Aldrich	Neal Ben-Ari, Joe Barrett, Gary O. Aldrich	Dick Decareau, Joe Barrett, Richard Ryder
Poppa	MacIntyre Dixon	Gibby Brand	Bob Morrisey
Marcella	Tricia Brooks	Tricia Brooks	Lisa Rieffel
Raggedy Ann	Ivy Austin	Ivy Austin	Ivy Austin
Raggedy Andy	Scott Schafer	Scott Schafer	Scott Schafer
Baby Doll	Carolyn Marble Valentis	Carolyn Marble Valentis	Carolyn Marble Valentis
Panda	Jeanne Vigliante	Jeanne Vigliante	Michelan Sisti
General D.	Paul Haggard	David Schramm	Leo Burmester
Bat	Pamela Sousa	Pamela Sousa	Gail Kathleen Benedict
Wolf	Tom Pletto	Tom Pletto	Gordon Joseph Weiss
Camel with the Wrinkled Knees	Joel Aroeste	Joel Aroeste	Joel Aroeste
Mommy	Bethe B. Austin	Bethe B. Austin	Bethe B. Austin
The Company	Helena Andreyko, Helena Binder, Melinda Buckley, Laura Carusone, Christine Hughes, John Thomas McGuire III, Betsy Normile	David Bunce, Laura Carusone, Scott Alan Evans, Nina Hennessey, Michaela Hughes, John Thomas McGuire III, Betsy Normile	Melinda Buckley, Gregory Butler, Anny DeGange, Susann Fletcher, Michaela Hughes, Steve Owsley, Andrea Wright
Stand-bys / Swings			Kenneth Boys, Helena Andreyko

== Background ==
=== Genesis ===
After finding success with their 1969 Hallmark Hall of Fame production of The Littlest Angel, Broadway producers Richard Horner and Lester Osterman searched for another property that they could adapt into a live-action TV special. Horner recalled: "Raggedy Ann came up in our conversation and I said, 'Gee, that would be a great thing for what we have in mind'". Horner set to work developing the project, with Littlest Angel co-writer (and Osterman's daughter) Patricia Thackray penning the script.

At a 1974 Friar's Club roast, Lester and Osterman found themselves seated at a table next to Sesame Street composer Joe Raposo, who expressed interest in their idea. Raposo recalled: "I was then presented with about two dozen books of Raggedy Ann and Andy". The composer studied the books and composed 25 songs for potential inclusion. Titled Rag Dolly: The Raggedy Ann Musical, the show was slated to feature Goldie Hawn and Dick Van Dyke as the rag dolls. According to Horner: "Then as we got further and further into the project, we realized that it had wider possibilities for acceptance than just as a television special. So we thought we should do it as a movie for theaters". The result was the 1977 animated feature Raggedy Ann & Andy: A Musical Adventure, as Raposo said that "it was going to be the kids movie of the season. It opened on Sunday... and on Wednesday a little movie called Star Wars that nobody thought would do anything opened and the rest is history". In 1981, Thackray dropped the music and reworked the film's script as a play titled Raggedy Ann & Andy, which remains available to license for regional/school productions in the US and Canada.

Several years later, Raposo joined the board of The Empire State Institute for the Performing Arts, (ESIPA) where producing director Patricia Snyder, who had seen the movie on television, urged him to adapt a stage musical for the character. The result was a workshop piece known as Raggedy Ann and Andy and/or Rag Dolly composed by Raposo and written by Tim Mason. It ran from December 10-20th, 1983, involving director Patricia Birch, guest director Bill Gile, and cast from actors in house at ESIPA. Starring Ivy Austin as Ann and Mark Baker as Andy, the show followed the dolls as they ran away from home to join the circus, but Raposo concluded "it simply didn't work".

=== Development ===
In 1984, Snyder, having retained the stage rights to the character after the closure of the previous play, asked playwright William Gibson for his opinion on the script and music, which largely unimpressed him. In passing, she told the fabled story of Johnny Gruelle creating the Raggedy Ann character to entertain his sickly daughter, Marcella, who died at the age of 13. In a journal he kept detailing the production, Gibson wrote: "I was hooked; death is a subject that always brings me to life as a writer". Gibson began sketching the plot that evening and composed the first draft over three weeks in August 1984.

According to Gibson's journal, he and Raposo had widely differing visions on the project, causing creative tension between the two practically from the start. At one point, Raposo unsuccessfully attempted to have Gibson ousted from the project. When Gibson learned that Raggedy Ann had been Raposo's pet project for a decade, he began to have empathy for the composer.

== Production history ==
=== ESIPA productions ===
Ivy Austin in the title role, performing "Rag Dolly"

Casting was held in a rehearsal studio at The Egg in Albany, New York, over three days in October 1984. Landing the title role was Ivy Austin, who had pre-established ties with both Birch and Raposo. The part of the Camel went to Joel Aroeste, who was a teacher at ESIPA, Carolyn Marble (Baby Doll), Tom Pletto (Wolf), and Jeanne Vigliante (Panda) were members of the ESIPA company, while Tricia Brooks (Marcella) was a local Albany resident. The rest of the production team consisted of set designers Gerry Hariton and Vicki Baral, costume designer Carrie Robbins, lighting designer Richard Nelson, and musical director Ross Allen. Gibson's friend, Shakespearean actor Paul Haggard, was cast as General D.

Paul Haggard in the original General D. "rat" makeup alongside Tom Pletto as Wolf

The play opened at ESIPA on December 7, 1984 under the title Raggedy Ann. The show played a week of previews and a week of performances, with many occurring in the morning with audiences composed entirely of busloads of New York area schoolchildren.

Almost immediately controversy ensued when Ellen Allen, a mother from Albany, New York, took her children to see the show. Horrified by the dark subject matter, Allen first complained to producing director Snyder and then took her complaints to the local news. Following the broadcast, the Albany public school district abruptly canceled their reservations for the show. Despite the negative publicity, the reviews were decent, and the audiences were wildly enthusiastic.

The show re-opened at ESIPA on October 25, 1985, under the title Rag Dolly, and played through November 1 as a dress rehearsal for the Russian production. David Schramm replaced Haggard as General D., Gibby Brand took over the role of Poppa, and two of the doctors were switched, but the rest of the principal cast was unchanged.

=== Moscow production ===
In 1972, Pat Snyder met and befriended Natalya Sats, legendary director of The Moscow Children's Theatre, through work with the International Children's Theatre Association. Sats journeyed to the US in September 1984 with a proposal for a new cultural exchange. She arrived just in time to see preliminary work on Raggedy Ann and made a return trip in December to catch a full performance. By March 1985, tentative plans were made to bring the show to Moscow, but this was not ensured until November, when U.S. and Soviet leaders signed a new cultural agreement at the Geneva Summit. At 5 a.m. on the morning of December 3, Snyder received a formal invitation via telephone, the deal was finalized six days later, and the cast began rehearsals in Moscow on January 2, 1986.

Production moved at a breakneck pace, with all of the performers from the second ESIPA staging reprising their roles, and a crew consisting of a mixture of persons from both countries. In preparation, Ivy Austin learned to sing "Rag Dolly" in Russian. Soon after arriving, Raposo panicked, realizing that the Russians couldn't provide some unusual instruments that he needed, so his wife had them expressed from New York. Only six of the twenty musicians were American, which required an interpreter to convey Raposo's intentions. The language barrier occasionally led to difficulties—most notably, when the composer wanted to evoke the sound of a Mariachi band—but musical director St. Louis was thoroughly awed by the orchestra's intensity.

The show was not widely advertised in Moscow, but word of mouth quickly spread, the performances sold out, and tickets were scalped for ten times their original cost. It opened under the title Rag Dolly: The Raggedy Ann Musical on January 6 and ran for two previews and eight performances. The play was largely performed in English, but each act opened with Russian narration, and cast members learned key phrases, occasionally breaking the fourth wall with little Russian asides that resulted in thunderous applause. Ivy Austin also received a three-minute standing ovation after she crooned the title song in Russian during the first preview, and all these pauses helped to bloat the running time to nearly three hours. Only a small percentage of the audience indicated a knowledge of English, and they sometimes laughed and clapped unexpectedly, but they were receptive to words like Rolls-Royce, Buick, and granny knot. The Russians provided zero criticism of the dark themes, but controversy would resume when the show returned to the US.

=== Kennedy Center/Broadway production ===
Roger L. Stevens, founding chairman of the Kennedy Center for the Performing Arts had seen one of the ESIPA stagings and agreed to produce the show on Broadway but urged the creators to bring back the original title, which had built-in brand awareness. The production, now titled Raggedy Ann: The Musical Adventure, had a month-long tryout at the Kennedy Center from August 23 to September 21, 1986. Some critics questioned why the Kennedy Center was producing it and were told that it was because "it took Moscow by storm!"

The show went into previews for Broadway on October 3 and officially opened on October 16, 1986, at the Nederlander Theatre, running for 15 previews and 5 performances before abruptly closing on October 19.

Director Birch summarized the production in an interview published the day after its closing: "This is an unusual, even bizarre, piece for the Broadway theater, but it has been done by three people who really care—myself, Bill Gibson and Joe Raposo—and a score of actors, a lot of whom are overqualified for what we've asked them to do. Those actors believe in this piece, and that's gratifying".

== Reception ==
Of the Kennedy Center performance, The Washington Post's David Richards said: "For all the echoes of past shows, Raggedy Ann is potentially an original". He praised Raposo's score, calling Rag Dolly "as infectious as mumps". Richards' only major complaint was the Marcella character, whom he described as "peevish, whiny and ungrateful", although he was mindful not to fault actress Lisa Rieffel. He determined: "It has some puddles of confusion and one glaring error at its center. But assuming its creators can iron things out, they've got a rarity on their hands—a musical that wants to talk to the child in the adult, just as it courts the adult in the child".

The Evening Sun's Lou Cedrone also remarked on the young audience's reaction, concluding: "Today's children, having listened to all those records and having seen all those horror movies, accept dark far more easily than adults".

Once the show arrived on Broadway, the reviews were uniformly negative. Ivy Austin recalled: "I cannot remember an audience that I felt rejected the show. The reviews on opening night were shocking to us all". Snyder elaborated that "it was just one bad review after another".

Beneath a headline declaring the show was a "child's garden of bad dreams", The North Jersey Record's Robert Feldberg said that Gibson "makes Macbeth look like Rebecca of Sunnybrook Farm". The New York Post's Howard Kissel titled his review "Throw It Back Into the Rag Bag" and summarized by stating: "Any little girl who prizes her own Raggedy Ann doll can probably tell better stories about it than this disjointed and distasteful musical". The New Jersey Pennysaver complained that it boasted "an uncurable case of the cutes coupled with an unnerving rush of boredom".

Austin later remarked that the show's future hinged on The New York Times review, which was assigned to Frank Rich, also known as "The Butcher of Broadway". He declared that the play "is loaded with psychoanalytic subtext—sex, death, and even a holocaustal mass grave are always peeking through Marcella's nightmares—but the author apparently considers it beneath him to wrap his highfalutin message in a coherent, let alone exciting, story". Rich went on to attack the "faceless pop songs" that made up Raposo's score, as well as Birch's direction and choreography, remarking that the Act I finale was "what Busby Berkeley might have done if he had only a half-dozen dancers and several celestial Hula-Hoops at his disposal".

The Philadelphia Daily News critic, Nels Nelson, denounced other reviewers for their unfair and hostile vilification, praising the show for having an "intellectual equilibrium" and providing "more than a mere suggestion of the seamy underside of the universe". Nelson proclaimed it "bright, tuneful, funny and such wonderful nonsense that I would have happily sat through it again".

Howard Kissel of the New York Daily News was very critical of the show, but he lavished the cast with praises, remarking that "Lisa Rieffel is especially appealing as the little girl, and Elizabeth Austin makes the most of her trampy mother. Leo Burmester, Gail Benedict, and Gordon Weiss are surprisingly winning as the villains". Jeffrey Lyons, an admitted classmate and friend of Raposo's, gave a glowing review. He raved about Ivy Austin, saying that she can "charm the rags off audiences, young and old", and Raposo's songs, which he called "some of the most endearing and inventive on Broadway in a long, long time".

In his book, Not Since Carrie: 40 Years of Broadway Musical Flops, Ken Mandelbaum described it as "one of the most bizarre musicals to ever reach Broadway". Touching on commonality in the reviews, he pointed out similarities to The Wizard of Oz and Peter Pan, remarking that "it was difficult to follow and never managed, as those musicals did, to come up with a coherent plot". He concluded that it was "too grim and humorless for children and offered too little to entertain adults".
