= Ivy Austin =

American actress (born 1958)

- Born: Ivy Lynn Epstein; January 19, 1958 (age 68); Brooklyn, New York, U.S.
- Education: Colgate University
- Occupations: Actress, singer
- Website: https://www.ivyaustin.com/

Ivy Austin (born Ivy Lynn Epstein; January 19, 1958 in Brooklyn, New York) is an American actress and singer known for her performances on Garrison Keillor's A Prairie Home Companion and her Sesame Street voices. She also starred on Broadway as Raggedy Ann.

== Biography ==
=== Early life and education ===
Ivy Austin is an alumna of NYC's High School of Performing Arts, has a Bachelor of Arts degree in biology from Colgate University, and a Master of Science degree in Marriage and Family Therapy from Manhattan College.

=== Career ===
Austin's stage career began with national tours of Hair (as Crissy) in 1976 and They're Playing Our Song (Alter Ego) in 1979. She made her New York City Opera debut in 1982's Candide (Pink Sheep) and remained on the guest artist roster through 1989. Other NYCO credits include Naughty Marietta (Lisette), The Merry Widow (Zozo), The Music Man (Ethel Toffelmier), The New Moon, The Desert Song, South Pacific, and Sweeney Todd (Beggar Woman). Austin's Broadway debut in 1986 was as the starring role in the Joe Raposo/William Gibson musical Raggedy Ann: The Musical Adventure, directed by Patricia Birch.

In 1989, Austin performed "The Story of Gloria" on American Radio Company (now known as A Prairie Home Companion). According to Time Magazine, "The show's funniest sketch, a serial, produced a new star, actress Ivy Austin." She also played the crusty-voiced French lady Babette, and sang with Rob Fisher and The Coffee Club Orchestra.

Austin has recorded countless songs for Sesame Street, and is the voice of Sesame Street characters Cereal Girl, Hammy Swinette, Sublime Miss M, Soo-ey Oinker of The Oinker Sisters, and Gloria Esta-worm. As writer/producer, Ivy Austin created holiday programs for National Public Radio and a long-running concert series at The World Financial Center. Ivy Austin appeared in numerous television commercials and has an impressive list of theatrical and concert credits.

Austin is in her sixth year as a contributing lyricist and performer in The Thalia Follies, a political satire in on New York's Upper West Side.

Austin performs regularly at Symphony Space on WNYC radio broadcasts of Selected Shorts and Bloomsday, and has participated in years of "Wall-to-Wall" music marathons. She appeared in Wall-to-Wall Broadway singing "Adelaide's Lament". She has performed several plays with the Night Kitchen Radio Theater for XM Satellite Radio.

== Selected credits ==
=== Discography ===
- Sing! Songs of Joe Raposo
- Big Bird Discovers the Orchestra
- Sesame Road
- Born to Add
- Splish Splash: Bathtime Fun
- Sing-Along Travel Songs
- Silly Songs
- Hot!/Heat! Hot!/Heat! Hot!/Heat! Dance Songs
- Sesame Street Platinum-All Time Favorites
- Elmopalooza!
- We Are All Earthlings
- I’m Green and I’m Proud
- Signs of the Times from Moo-town Records
- Sesame Street Kids/Kid Favorite Songs
- Sesame Street Best
- Cheap Thrills
- New York City Opera Candide
- Lady Be Good!
- Wall to Wall Richard Rodgers
- A Prairie Home Christmas
- A Prairie Home Companion 25th Anniversary Collection
- Selected Shorts: A Night at the Office

=== Filmography ===
- Grease 2 (1982) – Girl Greaser (Francine)
- "The Charmkins" (1983) – Skunkweed (voice)
- My Little Pony: Escape from Catrina (1985) – (voice)
- Snoopy!!! The Musical (1988) – (voice)
- Sesame Street – Cereal Girl, Hammy Swinette, Sublime Miss M, Soo-ey Oinker of The Oinker Sisters, Gloria Esta-worm, Additional Voices
- High Strung (1991) – Contestant
- Big Bird's Birthday Celebration (1991) – (voice) Oinker Sister
- The Tale of Peter Rabbit (1991) – (voice) Flopsy/Bluejay
- Animaniacs – Carloota, "Garage Sale of the Century/West Side Pigeons" (1993)
- Sesame Street Stays Up Late! (1993) – (voice) Tita
- The Real Shlemiel (1995) – (voice) The Lantuch
- Elmopalooza! (1998) – (voice) Oinker Sister
- Kids Favorite Songs (1999) - (voice) Oinker Sister: This Little Piggy to Market

=== Theatre credits ===
Production	Year	Role	Venue
No, No, Nanette	1974	Nanette	Gateway Playhouse
George M!	1974	Nellie Cohan	Gateway Playhouse
Hair	1974	Crissy	Gateway Playhouse
Alice in Wonderland	1975	Violet (singing voice)	Bil Baird Marionette Theatre
Hair	1975	Crissy	Gateway Playhouse
Sugar	1975	Society Syncopater	Gateway Playhouse
Irene	1975	Jane McFudd	Gateway Playhouse
Jesus Christ Superstar	1975	Apostle Woman	Gateway Playhouse
They're Playing Our Song	1979-81	A Voice of Sonia Walsk	National Tour
Candide	1982	Pink Sheep / Ensemble	New York City Opera
Candide	1983	Pink Sheep / Ensemble	Arena Stage
Sweeney Todd: The Demon Barber of Fleet Street	1984	Beggar Woman (alternate)	New York City Opera
Raggedy Ann	1984	Raggedy Ann	The Egg
Sweet Adeline	1985	Dot	New York Town Hall
Rag Dolly	1985-86	Raggedy Ann	The Egg and Natalya Sats Musical Theater
Candide	1986	Pink Sheep / Ensemble	New York City Opera
Raggedy Ann: The Musical Adventure	1986	Raggedy Ann	Nederlander Theatre
Sweeney Todd: The Demon Barber of Fleet Street	1987	Beggar Woman (alternate)	New York City Opera
The Music Man	1988	Ethel Toffelmier	New York City Opera

=== Artistic direction and producing ===
- Christmas at Rainbow Corner (co-producer Denise Lanctot) 1993, National Public Radio
- Her Funny Valentine, 1994, National Public Radio
- Women in Cabaret, 1994, World Financial Center
- Women on Broadway, 1995, World Financial Center
- The Tony Awards, 50 Years of Broadway's Best Musicals, 1996, World Financial Center
- The Men I Love, A Centennial Salute to Ira Gershwin & George Gershwin, 1997, World Financial Center
- Happy Birthday New York, A Musical Tribute to the City's Centennial, 1998, World Financial Center
- The Great Songwriters of Hollywood, 1999, World Financial Center
- Spring Fling, 2000, World Financial Center
