= Brian O'Dwyer =

American lawyer (born 1945)

Chair of the New York State Gaming Commission
- Incumbent
- Assumed office June 3, 2022
- Governor: Kathy Hochul

Personal details
- Born: October 10, 1945 (age 81) New York City, New York, U.S.
- Party: Democratic
- Education: George Washington University (BA, LLM); Middlebury College (MA); Georgetown University (JD)

Brian O'Dwyer (born October 10, 1945) is an American lawyer, activist, and active member of the Irish-American community. O'Dwyer currently serves as the Chair of the New York State Gaming Commission and a member of the Commission on Presidential Scholars. O'Dwyer spent most of his legal career advising labor organizations and supporting the rights of workers and immigrants. O'Dwyer's father, Paul O'Dwyer, was Ppresident of the City Council from 1973 to 1977. O'Dwyer's uncle, William O'Dwyer, was Mayor of New York City from 1945 to 1950.

== Early years and education ==
O'Dwyer was born on October 10, 1945, on the Upper West Side of Manhattan. He attended the High School of Music and Art (which later became Fiorello H. LaGuardia High School of Music & Art and Performing Arts). In 1961 following the election of John F. Kennedy he was one of the founders of the High School Democratic Association, with members drawn from most of New York's top high schools.

=== Family ===
He is the son of prominent New York lawyer Paul O'Dwyer, and nephew of Mayor William O'Dwyer. He is married to Marianna Page MacWilliam, the former associate vice chancellor of the State University of New York, with whom he has two children, Brendan Keith O'Dwyer and Kathleen Page O'Dwyer, and four grandchildren: Paul Ellis O'Dwyer, Patrick Trescott O'Dwyer, Reilly Page O'Dwyer, and Hailey Grace O'Dwyer.

=== Educational background ===
O'Dwyer received his Bachelor of Arts degree from the George Washington University in Spanish-American Literature and his Master of Arts degree in Spanish-Language Literature from Middlebury College in Madrid. Before becoming a lawyer, he studied Spanish at the National University of Mexico. He then received his Juris Doctor degree from Georgetown University and his master's in law from the George Washington University. In July 2013 he was an honorary degree of Doctor of Philosophy by Dublin City University. On August 16, 2019, his graduate alma mater, Middlebury College, conferred upon him the degree of Doctor of Humane Letters honoris causa at its Language Schools commencement.

=== Honorary awards ===
O'Dwyer is a member of the Sigma Delta Pi National Spanish Honorary Society, as well as a member and past International President of Kappa Sigma fraternity. He was honored in 2011 by its members as "Man of the Year." In 2000, he received recognition from the Catholic Church by being named as a Knight of the Holy Sepulchre, a papal knighthood conferred by Cardinal Edward Egan and has also been conferred The Child of Peace Award by the Catholic Home Bureau. He has received an honorary doctorate of philosophy from Dublin City University in 2013, which is the highest award given by the university. In October 2015 O'Dwyer was awarded the Seán MacBride Humanitarian Award by the Ancient Order of Hibernians for his work "To memorialize the human rights contributions made by Nobel Peace Laureate Dr. Sean MacBride and to recognize the efforts of others who make similar contributions in the cause of peace, justice, and the economic well-being of the Irish people…" On August 16, 2019, Middlebury College conferred an honorary doctorate of humane letters.

=== New York City St. Patrick's Day Parade grand marshal ===
It was announced in the fall of 2018 that O'Dwyer would be honored by the New York City St. Patrick's Day Parade Committee by serving as the parade's grand marshal in 2019. O'Dwyer has long served as an advocate for the Irish-American community in New York, focusing on immigration rights and reform for Irish citizens immigrating into the United States as well as supporting investment and development throughout Ireland, particularly focused on his family's original home of County Mayo. He will be the third O'Dwyer honored as grand marshal, following in the footsteps of his Uncle William O'Dwyer who held the title in 1938 and his father, Paul O'Dwyer, who did the same in 1974.

== Work ==
=== Legal career ===
O'Dwyer has spent virtually his entire legal career at O'Dwyer & Bernstien, LLP, a law firm founded by his late father, Paul O'Dwyer, which concentrates on personal injury, immigration rights, labor relations, disability rights and general commercial litigation. He serves as the firm's senior partner. He has been cited as a New York Super Lawyer since its inception, which is a peer ranking is given to only the top 5% of the profession as surveyed by the Bar of New York City. He has also been awarded a rating for 25 years that puts him at the very top of his profession. He serves as general counsel of the US Airline Pilots Association, and represents pilots throughout the United States. O'Dwyer has been cited as winning the highest personal injury award – $61 million – in the United States.

=== Academic studies ===
As a former teacher of Spanish at the George Washington University and Malcolm King College, O'Dwyer has been active in education. He serves as Treasurer of the City University of New York Law School Foundation and was a recipient of the Dean's Medal. He also serves as a Co-Chair of the board of the Graduate School of Political Management of the George Washington University.

=== Gaming Commission ===
On June 3, 2022, O'Dwyer was appointed to the Gaming Commission and named Chair by Governor Kathy Hochul.

Additionally, on September 27, 2022, O'Dwyer was additionally made chair of the NYS Thoroughbred Breeding and Development Fund, and the Agriculture and New York State Horse Breeding and Development Fund. Both of these boards are housed under the NYS Gaming Commission.

In October 2022, O'Dwyer named Vicki Been, Stuart Rabinowitz, and Quenia Abreu to the Gaming Facilities Location Board.

== Lobbyist and causes ==
O'Dwyer is known as a Democratic Party "stalwart." He considers the Democratic Party the party for the "poor and dispossessed."

=== Immigration ===
Immigration is high on O'Dwyer's list for lobbying. He has received special citations from Governor Mario Cuomo at the New York City Council for his work with immigrant groups. As a son of Irish immigrants, O'Dwyer has been especially influential and active in America's Irish Community. He has been a guest of honor and an award recipient by the Irish Immigration Reform Movement; an award recipient of the Brehon Law Society, the Ancient Order of Hibernians and was selected Chief Brehon of the Coney Island Irish Fair. In 1998, he was the grand marshal of the St. Patrick's Day Parade, in Rockaway, N.Y.

O'Dwyer has been a consummate advocate for immigrants' rights. He was founder of the Emerald Isle Immigration Center, which is the largest Irish immigrant center in the United States. In its almost 25 years of existence, the center has helped literally thousands of Irish men and women as they immigrated to New York City. The center also serves as a focal point for the advocacy of Irish immigrant causes. O'Dwyer has served as chairman and counselor to the Associacion Tepeyac as well, which provides advocacy and services to New York's growing Mexican community. One of his greatest accomplishments for immigration reform was when helped convince the late New York City Mayor Edward Koch to open the doors of New York City's public universities and colleges to all immigrants regardless of their documented status. As an attorney he has concentrated on defending undocumented workers hurt in the course of their employment.

=== Causes ===
O'Dwyer has been cited for his efforts on behalf of the people of Puerto Rico by the Governor of Puerto Rico and was made honorary grand marshal of the Puerto Rican Parade in 1993. He has been chosen by "Irish America" magazine on numerous occasion as a member of the "Top 100" Irish in the United States. O'Dwyer is a recipient of the Ellis Island Medal of Honor Award and the Outreach Project Annual Service Award 1994. In June 2012, O'Dwyer was honored as one of the top 25 Irish who have made a difference by Irish Voice Magazine. The award recognized him as one of the top leaders of the Irish Community in the New York area, and as someone who has had a significant positive impact in changing the community. The Irish Echo, the oldest Irish American Newspaper, has bestowed upon him 2013's Man of the Year Award.

O'Dwyer's work in the political arena has concentrated largely on promoting Irish and Irish-American interests. He served as national chairman of Irish Americans for Clinton-Gore in 1992 and 1996 and Irish-Americans for Gore in 2000, and was founding member of the National Democratic Ethnic Coordinating Committee and Irish American Democrats. He was part of the delegation that accompanied President Bill Clinton to Ireland on each of his three trips and served as an advisor to the White House on Irish issues including the peace process. He was appointed by President Clinton as a commissioner of the President's Commission on White House Fellowships and was awarded the Director Citation for Exemplary Public Service by the White House Director of Personnel citing his work on the commission. In June 2011, Secretary of State Hillary Clinton appointed him as Commissioner of the United States National Commission for UNESCO.

O'Dwyer has actively worked to advance Ireland's cause in the United States. He has been recognized with numerous awards by Irish organizations in special recognition of his work in promoting Irish interests in the United States. He serves as chairman of the Irish Chamber of Commerce USA where he works to facilitate American investment in Ireland and Northern Ireland. He has accompanied many US public officials on their trips to Ireland and Northern Ireland, including New York City Council Speaker Christine Quinn, New York City Comptroller John Liu and Secretary of State Hillary Rodham Clinton, and New York's Sen. Kirsten Gillibrand to Ireland. He also serves as a member of the Board of Ireland West Airport in Knock, County Mayo Ireland.

In 2015 O'Dwyer, along with radio broadcaster Adrian Flannelly and 200 others attended a pilgrimage led by Cardinal Dolan to the Knock Shrine in County Mayo, Ireland. The visit was the first official chartered pilgrimage to Ireland's national Marian Shrine from anywhere and the first diocesan pilgrimage from the archdiocese of New York to the Marian Shrine. The pilgrimage also marked the first time an Aer Lingus plane has flown from New York to Ireland West Airport.

A former member of the New York City Human Rights Commission, O'Dwyer has also been an advocate for victims of sexual harassment and police brutality.
