= Humberto López Cruz =

Cuban American writer (born 1959)

Humberto López Cruz (born 1959, Havana, Cuba) is a Cuban American writer. He earned a Ph.D. in Spanish at Florida State University. Currently, he is a professor of Spanish and Latin American Studies at the University of Central Florida, in Orlando. He has authored two poetry collections, Escorzo de un instante (2003) and Festinación (2012); his poems and other work have appeared in several publications in the United States, Spain, and Panamá. He has authored and/or edited several books on literary criticism. In addition, his articles have been published in respected academic journals, as well as in book chapters in accredited series, in the United States, Panama, Costa Rica, Mexico, Nicaragua, Guatemala, Puerto Rico, and Spain.

== Relevance in Panamanian Literature ==
Dr. López Cruz is a scholar and an admirer of Panamanian literature, and sees the value in how literature in Panama narrates the nation, as with every new reading Panama is "rewritten". In 1995 was when he experienced Panamanian literature for the first time, and after several years of corresponding with Panamanian intellectuals, he was eventually invited to take part in an international and cultural event, so named Literatura y Nación. Dr. López Cruz is considered as one of the best foreign scholars of literature relating to the nation of Panama. As a promoter of Panamanian literature, Dr. López Cruz is also invited to Panama to participate in literary panels in order to represent the country. Dr. López Cruz has also made many contributions to reviews and national journals about Panama. Dr. López Cruz has also had his work reviewed in other papers

== Awards and recognition ==
Dr. López Cruz was inducted as a correspondent member of Academia Norteamericana de la Lengua Epañola (ANLE) in 2016.

In 2015, Dr. López Cruz' was given the highest honor by the University of Central Florida by being awarded the Pegasus Professor award. This award is only given out to a small number of professors each year by the President of the university, and is an award for "highly successful teaching, research and creative activity, and service accomplished by senior members of the university faculty".

In the 2015–2016 academic year, Dr. López Cruz received the Founder's Day Award for Excellence in Research, and in 2013 he was selected as one of the 20 Fabulous Hispanic Higher-Education Professors in Florida by Online Schools Florida

On November 30, 2000, Dr. López Cruz was also awarded the Order of Los Descubridores by Sigma Delta Pi, which is the National Collegiate Hispanic Honor Society. The Order of Los Descubridores is awarded for "exceptional and meritorious service in the fields of Hispanic scholarship, the teaching of Spanish, and the promotion of good relations between English-speaking countries and those of Spanish speech." This is one of the highest honors awarded by Sigma Delta Pi.

== Published works ==
=== Books of Poetry ===
- Rocallas del andén. Valencia: Aduana Vieja, 2019.
- Festinación. Valencia: Aduana Vieja, 2012.
- Escorzo de un instante. Madrid: Betania, 2001.

=== Books on Literary Criticism ===
- Dulce María Loynaz: un verso en el tiempo. Valencia: Aduana Vieja, 2024.
- Tetrapalabra: cuatro ensayos sobre letras cubanas. Valencia: Aduana Vieja, 2020.
- Panamá, letras de hoy. Panamá: Círculo de Lectura Guillermo Andreve, 2005.
- Asedio a Panamá: su literatura. Panamá: U of Santa María La Antigua Press, 2002.

=== Book Edition ===
- El garrote en Cuba, by Manuel López Valdés. 2nd ed. Introduction and Bibliography by Humberto López Cruz, Miami: Universal, 2000.
- Guillermo Cabrera Infante: el subterfugio de la palabra, Ed., Intro., and bibliography by Humberto López Cruz, Madrid: Hispano Cubana, 2009.
- Virgilio Piñera: el artificio del miedo, Ed., Intro., and bibliography by Humberto López Cruz, Madrid: Hispano Cubana, 2012.
- Gastón Baquero: la visibilidad de lo oculto, Ed., Intro., and bibliography by Humberto López Cruz, Madrid: Hispano Cubana, 2015.
- Individual poems have been published in the following journals: Confluencia, Horizontes, Maga, Baquiana, RANLE, Sinalefa.
- Individual creative essays have been published in: Revista Hispano Cubana, Hispanic Outlook, Horizontes, and La Habana Elegante.
