= Leo Burmester =

American actor

- Born: Bernard Leo Burmester; February 1, 1944; Louisville, Kentucky, U.S.
- Died: June 28, 2007 (aged 63); New York City, U.S.
- Education: Western Kentucky University; University of Denver (MFA)
- Occupations: Actor; Singer
- Spouse: Lora Lee Ecobelli (2005–2007)

Bernard Leo Burmester (February 1, 1944 – June 28, 2007) was an American actor of stage and screen.

== Early life and education ==
Burmester was born and raised in Louisville, Kentucky, and studied at Western Kentucky University as a biology major before switching to drama. He worked summer stock at Shawnee Summer Theatre of Greene County, Indiana. After receiving an MFA from the University of Denver, he taught college for a year before becoming a working actor.

== Career ==
Stage

Burmester appeared with the Actors Theatre of Louisville, originating roles in Marsha Norman's drama play Getting Out and James McLure's Lone Star, and eventually recreating them in his off-Broadway and Broadway debuts, respectively.

On Broadway, he is known for performing as the booming villain General D. in Raggedy Ann: The Musical Adventure (1986). He played the role of Monsieur Thénardier in the original production of Les Misérables, the role of Bradley in the 1996 revival of Sam Shepard's drama Buried Child directed by Gary Sinise, and as Sid Davis in a 1998 revival of Eugene O'Neill's comedy Ah, Wilderness! at Lincoln Center. He played the Police Sergeant in Harry Connick, Jr.'s musical Thou Shalt not (2001). Other Broadway roles include the award-winning musical The Civil War (1999), and the musical adaptation, Urban Cowboy (2003).

Off-Broadway roles include Hucklebee in a revival of the 1960 musical The Fantasticks.

Screen

Burmester made his feature film debut in a big budget project with Cruising (1980), and had a featured role as the mortuary director in Honky Tonk Freeway (1981). Burmester played one of the FBI agents hounding the faux Rosenberg couple in Daniel (1983). He played Holly Hunter's character's father in the prologue of Broadcast News (1987), and the bum in front of The Plaza in Big Business (1988). Roles started to get larger with James Cameron's The Abyss (1989), as Catfish DeVries, decompression expert. Burmester worked for director John Sayles several times, including in Passion Fish (1992) and Lone Star (1996), and also for directors such as William Friedkin, Clint Eastwood, Robert Altman, John Schlesinger and Sidney Lumet, and as the Apostle Nathaniel in Martin Scorsese's The Last Temptation of Christ (1988).

On television, Burmester starred in the CBS sitcom Flo as Randy Stumphill, the mechanic who frequented the bar. Burmeister also played Woodrow Wilton, in season two episode of Walker, Texas Ranger, the episode was called "An Innocent Man", where he played a guy framed for murder.

== Personal life and death ==
Burmester died at age 63 on June 28, 2007, in New York City, from complications from a tick bite and leukemia after surgery to relieve pressure on his brain. Burmester was survived by his wife, Lora Lee Echobelli, and children, Daniel and Colette. His ashes were scattered in Kentucky.

== Theatre ==
- Lone Star (1979)
- Big River (1985)
- Raggedy Ann (1986)
- Les Misérables (1987) – Thénardier
- Buried Child (1996)
- Ah, Wilderness (1998)
- The Civil War (1999)
- Thou Shalt Not (2001) – The Police Officer
- Urban Cowboy (2003)
- The Fantasticks (2006) – Hucklebee

== Filmography ==
=== Film ===
Leo Burmester film credits
Year	Title	Role	Notes	Ref.
1980	Cruising	Water Sport		
1981	Honky Tonk Freeway	Mortuary Director		
1983	Daniel	FBI Agent #1		
1984	The House of God	Dr. Gath		
1986	Odd Jobs	Wylie D. Daiken		
1986	Sweet Liberty	Hank		
1987	Broadcast News	Jane's Dad		
1988	The Last Temptation of Christ	Nathaniel, Apostle		
1988	Big Business	Bum		
1989	The Abyss	'Catfish' De Vries		
1992	Article 99	'Shooter' Polaski		
1992	Passion Fish	Reeves		
1992	Innocent Blood	Dave Flinton		
1992	Fly by Night	Rickey Tick	Directed by Steve Gomer	
1993	A Perfect World	Deputy Tom Adler		
1995	The Neon Bible	Bobbie Lee Taylor		
1996	Lone Star	Cody		
1997	The Devil's Advocate	Florida Prosecutor		
1997	Switchback	Clyde 'Shorty' Callahan		
1998	The Secret of Mulan	(voice)	Video	
1998	River Red	Judge Perkins		
1998	The Farmhouse	Dallas Miller		
1999	Getting to Know You	Lamar Pike, Sr.		
1999	Saturn	Dad		
1999	Limbo	Harmon King		
1999	Dumbarton Bridge	Jack		
2002	The End of the Bar	Boxing Trainer		
2002	City by the Sea	Lieutenant Katt		
2002	Out of These Rooms	Kit's Dad		
2002	Gangs of New York	Telegraph Operator No. 1 (voice)		
2003	Red Betsy	Emmet Rounds		
2004	America Brown	Bo Williams		
2005	Patch	Mr. Moynahan	Short	
2005	The Legend of Zorro	Colonel Beauregard		
2013	Aftermath	Sheriff	Final film role	

=== Television ===
Leo Burmester television credits
Year	Title	Role	Notes	Ref.
1980–1981	Flo	Randy Stumphill	28 Episodes	
1982	Rattlesnake in a Cooler	The Doctor / Prisoner	TV movie	
1983	Rage of Angels	Jim	TV movie	
1983	Chiefs	Emmett Spence	TV miniseries	
1984	George Washington	Eban Krutch	TV miniseries	
1986	George Washington II: The Forging of a Nation	Eban Krutch	TV miniseries	
1988	The Equalizer	Jim Harding	Episode: "No Place Like Home"	
1989	The Equalizer	Coach Bell	Episode: "Suicide Squad"	
1989–1990	True Blue	Officer Red Tollin	12 episodes	
1991	Young Riders	Mr. Marsh	Episode: "The Initiation"	
1993	Walker, Texas Ranger	Woodrow Jonathan Wilton	Episode: "An Innocent Man"	
1993	Alex Haley's Queen	Henderson	TV miniseries	
1994	Law & Order	Defense Attorney Lester Hastings	Episode: "Snatched"	
1995	The Great Elephant Escape	Ethridge	TV movie	
1995	Truman	Frank Vassar	TV movie	
1996	Mistral	Commissioner Russell Crane	TV movie	
1996	Law & Order	Mr. Le Clair	Episode: "Charm City: Part 1"	
1997	William Faulkner's Old Man	Plump Convict	TV movie. AKA, Hallmark Hall of Fame: Old Man	
1997	...First Do No Harm	Bob Purdue	TV movie	
1999	Shake, Rattle and Roll: An American Love Story	Corby Judd (Part 1)	TV miniseries	
2002	Monday Night Mayhem	Carl Lindermann	TV movie	
2002	Law & Order: Criminal Intent	Lorne Cutler	Episode: "The Third Horseman"	
2002	Law & Order	Defense Attorney Lester Hastings	Episode: "Patriot"	
2004	Carry Me Home	Grizzle	TV movie	
2006	Law & Order: Special Victims Unit	Bud Gabler	Episode: "Cage"	
