= Araceli Ardón =

Mexican writer (born 1958)

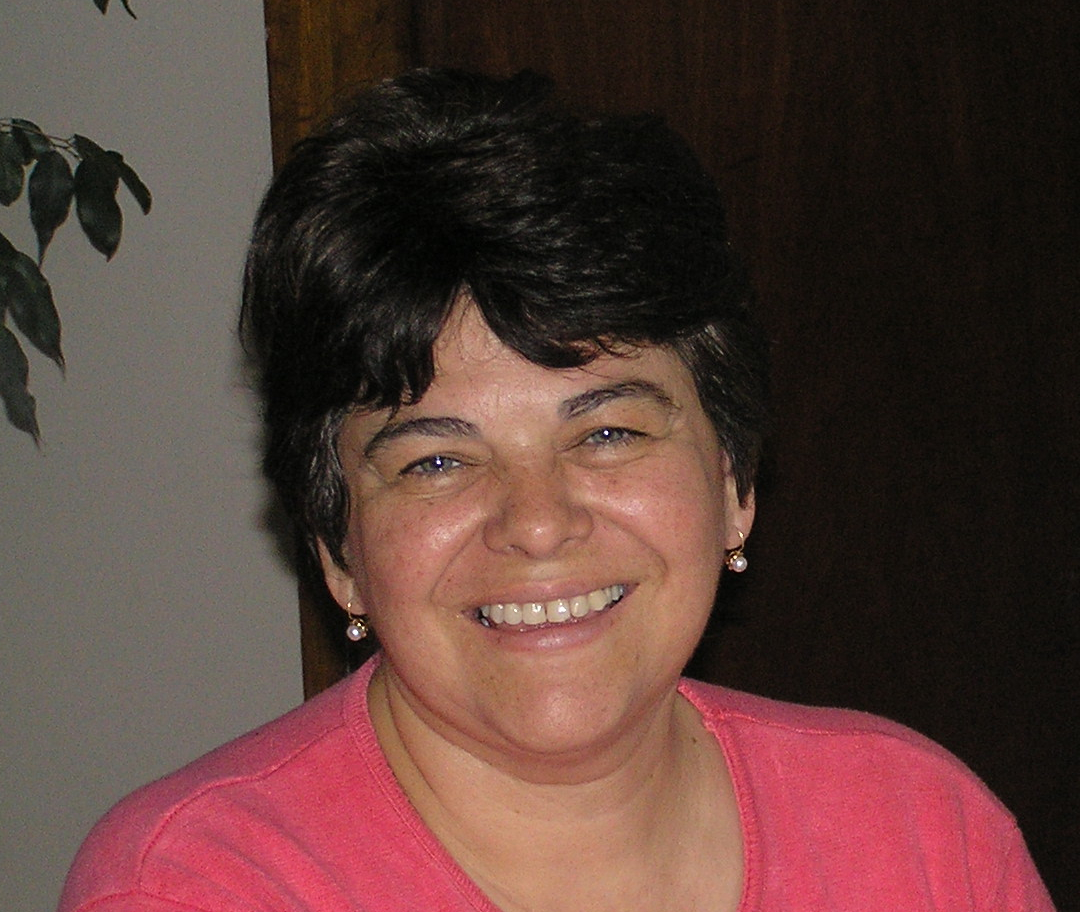
- Born: January 21, 1958 (age 68); San Miguel de Allende, Guanajuato
- Occupations: Writer, Journalist, College Professor
- Website: www.araceliardon.com

Araceli Ardón (born January 21, 1958) is a Mexican writer from Santiago de Querétaro, Querétaro.

== Life and education ==
Although Ardón's family is from Querétaro, she was born in San Miguel de Allende, Guanajuato. This is because her parents there went to start a business, catering to foreigners living there, but it did not succeed. The family returned and Ardón studied primary school at Plancarte, where her teacher would regularly take students into the surrounding fields for lessons in biology and botany. She attended high school at Prepa en la Universidad.

She did her undergraduate work at Monterrey Institute of Technology and Higher Studies, Querétaro campus and later took graduate level courses in Hispanic American literature at Harvard. Later in her career, she obtained a certificate in 2000 in museum curation from the Museo de América in Madrid with a scholarship from the Spanish government.

== Writing career ==
Ardón’s writing and editing career has mostly focused on cultural topics, often related to the state of Querétaro. She began writing in high school. Her writing work has varied from translating books and other publications (since 1986) to being a columnist for the newspaper El Universal Querétaro and an editor for Heraldo de Navidad to editing books on history, poetry and short stories.

In 1986, she founded and directed the Comunicación del Centro which published the cultural magazine Ventana de Querétaro (Window of Querétaro) until 1989. Through Paula de Allende, she had the opportunity to meet various Mexican writers such as Carlos Monsiváis, Jose Emilio Pacheco, Eraclio Zepeda, Silvia Soto, Alejandro Aura and Hugo Gutierrez Vega. She has interviewed a number of important figures in Querétaro culture and history including Manuel de la Llata, Antonio Perez Alcocer, Esteban Paulin Gonzalez and Jose Guadalupe Ramirez Alvarez. Many of her interviewees have been well advanced in age, with many stories to tell. She wrote the biography of surrealist painter Restituto Rodriguéz.

She was one of the first women writers to participate in the Festival Internacional de Escritores y Literatura in San Miguel de Allende, giving workshops and lectures.

== Teaching career ==
From 1980 to 1999, Ardón taught various courses in Hispanic American literature, as well as composition in Spanish and Spanish for foreigners at the high school and college level in both Mexico and the United States. In 1988, she was invited to teach Spanish as a second language at Oregon State University. From 2007 to 2009, she was a visiting professor and artist-in-residence at Westmont University in Santa Barbara, California.

== Administrative career ==
Ardón has been involved with nine non-profit organizations in the arts and culture in Mexico. In 1990 she founded the Querétaro delegation of the Mexican chapter of Asociación Mundial de Mujeres Periodistas y Escritoras (AMMPE), directing it for five years. She was president of the Corresponsalía Querétaro del Seminario de Cultura Mexicana for ten years.

From 2009 to 2013, she was the director of the DRT Foundation in Querétaro. In 2016, she became the second director of the Centro de las Artes de Querétaro (Querétaro Arts Center), after served as president of the Amigos del Museo de Arte de Querétaro. This institution is housed in a colonial building where her father proposed to her mother in 1955. Ardón has also been a member of Código Áureo, a gallery and cultural space, directing various literary workshops.

== Recognition ==
She won the Premio Nacional de Periodismo y Literatura Rosario Castellanos, sponsored by AMMPE in 1988. In 2006, she received the Junipero Serra Medal by the state congress for her cultural work. In 2008, she received honorary membership in Sigma Delta Pi for her work in promoting the Spanish language.

== Selected works ==
=== Narrative ===
- Historias íntimas de la casa de Don Eulogio (1998) ISBN 978-968-6771-02-2
- A Shelter for Fantasy, a House of Goblins, in "Platícame del Parque / Tell me about the Park" (2004)
- El arzobispo del gorro azul (2006) ISBN 978-968-5131-04-9
- It is Nothing of Mine, in "Mexico: a Traveler's Literary Companion" (2006) ISBN 978-1-883513-15-3
- Falsos silogismos de colores (2018) ISBN 978-6079791308

=== Children's narrative ===
- La pandilla de Miguel (2002)

=== Biography ===
- Semblanza: Roberto Ruiz Obregón (2001).
- Restituto Rodríguez – Surrealista (2014) ISBN 978-607-96622-0-2
- Junípero Serra: santo queretano, mallorquín y californiano (2015) ISBN 978-607-00-9261-9

=== As co-author ===
- Romance de Piedra y Canto (1998) ISBN 978-968-7442-20-4
- Fernando Garrido (2007) ISBN 978-970-95796-0-4
- Opus Liber Unus-Abel García Salinas (2011)
- Trayecto-Benjamín Hierro (2012) ISBN 978-697-95969-0-4
- Miradas angelicales (2013)
- Museo de Arte de Querétaro (2013) ISBN 978-607-7906-32-2
- Los caminos de Fray Junípero Serra en Querétaro (2013) ISBN 978-607-95969-1-0
