= Karl E. Rissland =

American musician (1894–1971)

- Born: Karl Ernest Rissland; December 22, 1894; New York City, U.S.
- Died: February 13, 1971 (aged 76) Saratoga Springs, New York, U.S.
- Genres: Concert band, Orchestra
- Occupation: Musician
- Instruments: Cornet, trumpet
- Years active: 1933–1959

Karl E. Rissland (December 22, 1894 – February 13, 1971) was an American trumpeter known for his role as the official bugler for New York State horse racetracks, where he performed traditional calls to start races at venues including Belmont Park, Jamaica Racetrack, and Saratoga Race Course, as well as for his work as a principal trumpeter in major symphony orchestras.

Born in New York City, Rissland served as first trumpet with the New York, Chicago, Minneapolis, and San Francisco Symphony Orchestras, contributing to the classical music scene in multiple American cities. He gained additional public recognition for his distinctive racetrack role, appearing on the television program What's My Line? where his occupation as the salaried official racetrack bugler for tracks in the New York area was featured.

== Military service ==
Karl E. Rissland served in the United States Army during World War I, attaining the rank of sergeant.

== Symphony Orchestra Career ==
Karl E. Rissland held the position of first trumpet in several major American symphony orchestras during his symphonic career. He played first trumpet with the New York Symphony Orchestra under conductor Walter Damrosch. Sources also confirm his service as first trumpet with the Minneapolis Symphony Orchestra and the San Francisco Symphony Orchestra. These roles established him as a respected principal trumpet player in prominent ensembles before he shifted to other professional opportunities in the early 1940s.

== Racetrack bugler career ==
Karl E. Rissland served as the official bugler at major thoroughbred racetracks in New York State from 1940 to 1959, during which time he became a familiar figure in New York racing culture. In this capacity, he performed the traditional bugle calls—most notably First call to signal that horses were approaching the starting gate and to mark the beginning of each race. His performances took place at Saratoga Race Course, Belmont Park, Aqueduct Racetrack, and Jamaica Racetrack, where his distinctive playing and recognizable presence added to the ceremonial atmosphere of the events. Rissland's role extended over nearly two decades, making him a longstanding fixture of New York racing culture until health issues intervened. By 1959, illness prevented him from performing at the Saratoga meeting opener, leading officials to use a recording of his bugle call in his absence. His tenure ended that year, concluding a significant chapter in his career that bridged his earlier orchestral work with this unique public-facing position in horse racing.

== Broadcast and media appearances ==
Rissland performed on radio on Radio Station WGY as a cornetist in the early 1930s, as listed in contemporary program schedules. This role showcased his musical expertise in a broadcast setting during his earlier career. Rissland's only known television appearance was as a contestant on the game show What's My Line? in the episode which aired April 8, 1956, where he was presented as the "Official Racetrack Bugler." This guest spot arose from his position with the New York Racing Association. No other television credits are documented for him.

== Personal life and death ==
Rissland had a wife, the former Mary Festa. He died on February 13, 1971, at Saratoga Hospital in Saratoga Springs, Saratoga County, New York, after a long illness. He was 76 years old. Funeral services were held at the Simone Funeral Home, with Rev. Paul Buchheimer, pastor of St. Paul's Lutheran Church, officiating. Interment took place at Greenfield Cemetery in Greenfield, Saratoga County, New York.
