= Sigma Delta Pi =

American collegiate Hispanic honor society

- ΣΔΠ
- Founded: November 14, 1919; 106 years ago University of California, Berkeley
- Type: Honor
- Affiliation: ACHS
- Status: Active
- Emphasis: Spanish
- Scope: National
- Motto: Spanías Didagéi Proágomen
- Colors: Red and Gold
- Flower: red carnation
- Publication: Entre Nosotros
- Chapters: 625+
- Members: 180,000+ lifetime
- Headquarters: c/o Mark P. Del Mastro; Department of Hispanic Studies; College of Charleston; 66 George Street; Charleston, South Carolina 29424-0001; United States
- Website: www.sigmadeltapi.org

Sigma Delta Pi (ΣΔΠ) is the national collegiate Hispanic honor society (La Sociedad Nacional Honoraria Hispánica). It was established on November 14, 1919, at the University of California at Berkeley. It has chartered more than 640 chapters in the United States.

== History ==
Sigma Delta Pi (ΣΔΠ), the National Collegiate Hispanic Honor Society (La Sociedad Nacional Honoraria Hispánica), was established on November 14, 1919 at the University of California, Berkeley.

The society recognizes seven founding members but acknowledges an undergraduate UC Berkeley student named Ruth Barnes as its organizer and first president. On Friday, November 14, 1919, Barnes invited six other students of Spanish to her residence at 2545 Dwight Way to start what would eventually become the largest collegiate foreign language honor society in the U.S. Those six students who joined Barnes at her home were Miriam Burt, Ferdinand V. Custer, Anna Krause, Margaret Priddle, Ruth Rhodes, and Vera Stump

On May 1, 1920, under the direction of Barnes, Sigma Delta Pi held its first formal induction ceremony at Burt's home on 1629 Walnut Street in Berkeley, California. November is celebrated annually as National Charter Month, and May 1 is commemorated as Sigma Delta Pi Day.

Its mission:

- To honor those who excel in the study of Spanish language and in the study of the literature and the culture of the Spanish-speaking world;
- To foster an understanding, appreciation and respect for the peoples, cultures and societies of the Spanish-speaking world;
- To honor those who have promoted and reinforced a better understanding of the contributions of the Spanish-speaking world; and
- To serve its membership in support of the Society's goals and ideals.

Unlike many collegiate honor societies, Sigma Delta Pi was conceived, planned, and funded entirely by students, and for the first ten years of its existence they directed its activities, driving it to become a national society with sixteen chapters at universities across the United States.

In 1966, Sigma Delta Pi joined the Association of College Honor Societies. By 2011, it had 385 active chapters and had initiated 170,389 members.

In 2017, Sigma Delta Pi launched La Sociedad Honoraria de la Lengua Española, an honor society for Spanish students in two-year colleges. As of 2025, the Society has chartered over 640 chapters and initiated over 180,000 lifetime members.

== Symbols ==
Sigma Delta Pi's insignia is the royal seal of Ferdinand and Isabella that represents Castille, León and Aragon. Its motto is Spanías Didagéi Proágomen. The society's colors are red and gold and its flower is the red carnation. Its newsletter is called Entre Nosotros.

== Chapters ==
Sigma Delta Pi currently has over 625 chapters, 368 of which are considered active—a chapter that holds at least one induction of new members during three years.

== Membership ==
There are three classes of membership in Sigma Delta Pi: active, alumnus and honorary. Election to the Order of the Discoverers and/or the Order of Don Quijote constitutes two other categories of membership, both of which are considered prestigious and above the three aforementioned categories of membership. Also, whereas active and honorary membership candidates are screened only by the local chapter, candidates for the Orders must be nominated through the national headquarters.

Student members are invited to join based on superior academic achievement in strict accordance with the criteria set forth by the Association of College Honor Societies. These include:

- They must have completed at least three years, or the equivalent, of college Spanish, including at least three semester hours of a third-year course in Hispanic literature or Hispanic culture and civilization. Those students enrolled in these courses are eligible for membership if the instructor will certify that their work is a B quality or better;
- Their grades in all Spanish courses must average at least 3.0 on a 4.0 scale;
- They must rank in the upper 35% of their class (sophomore, junior, senior) or in cases where an institution does not record class rank, maintain a 3.20 cumulative GPA;
- They must have completed at least three semesters or five-quarters of college work;
- They must show genuine interest in things Hispanic and be of good moral character.

== Organization ==
The Society has a national president, an executive director, five regional vice presidents, and a board of student advisers. The executive director and the executive committee member-at-large are appointed, the national president and vice presidents are nominated and elected by the active chapters, and the members of the board of student advisers apply for board membership and are selected by current board members and the executive committee. The society is governed by an executive council consisting of the seven aforementioned officials, the immediate past president, the president emeriti, and the executive committee member-at-large.

Each active chapter is required to have a faculty sponsor who is also a member of Sigma Delta Pi and is responsible for overseeing the activities of the chapter. Also, each chapter is encouraged to elect student officers to assist with the direction of the chapter.

== Notable members ==
- Evelyn Daniel Anderson, educator and advocate for physically disabled people.
- Araceli Ardón, writer
- Lourdes Espinola, poet and diplomat
- Brian O'Dwyer, chair of the New York State Gaming Commission
- Aileen Quinn, actress, singer, and dancer
- Alberto Ruy Sánchez, writer and editor
- Enrico Mario Santí, writer and poet
- Ana Celia Zentella, linguist

== See also ==
- Honor cords
