= Pinnacle Race Course =

Horse track

Coordinates: 42°10′23.83″N 83°21′50.47″W

- Interactive map of Pinnacle Race Course
- Location: Huron Township, Wayne County, Michigan, USA
- Owned by: Jerry Campbell
- Date opened: 2008
- Date closed: November 3, 2010
- Race type: Thoroughbred

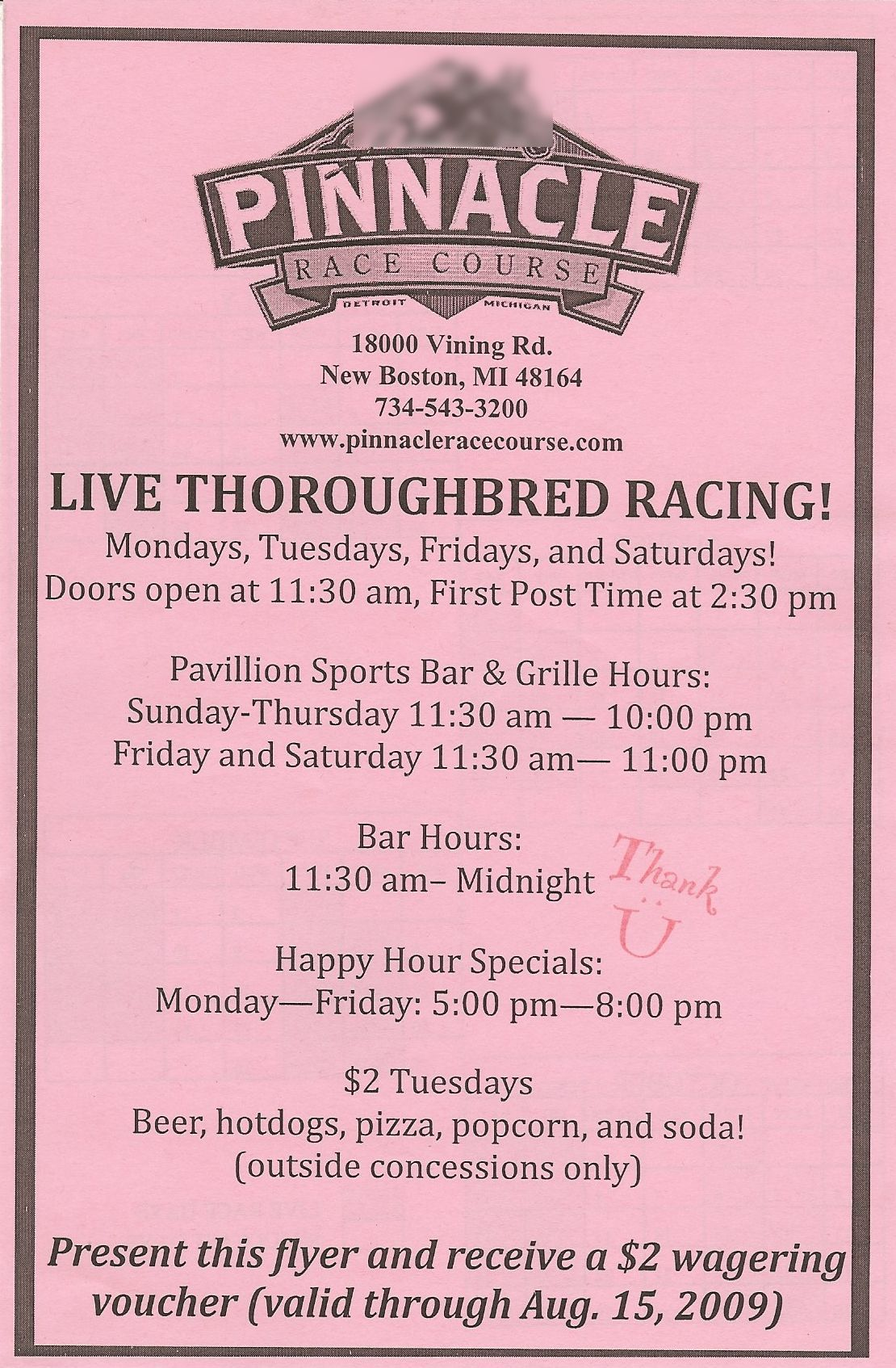

Pinnacle Race Course was a thoroughbred horse racing track in Huron Township, Michigan, southwest of Detroit off of Interstate 275. The track was just south of the Detroit Metro Airport, in Wayne County. The track was built on land owned by Wayne County, and the county lost $36 million when it failed. In 2021, it was announced that an Amazon fulfillment center will be constructed on the site of the former track.

== Development and opening ==
The track was described by Wayne County Executive Robert Ficano as an experiment in cutting red tape. Ficano said, "I see this as an experiment to see if we can deliver speed, speed, speed..." Ficano was convinced by Republic Bancorp founder Jerry Campbell that a track would be viable in Wayne County, and would generate 2,300 permanent jobs. Based on this Wayne County sold the developer 320 acres of land for $1, and spent $26 million building roads, and installing sewer and water to the site.

The track opened on July 18, 2008. The track was rushed into operation in the summer of 2008 to replace Muskegon's Great Lakes Downs on the Michigan racing schedule. Magna Entertainment Corporation closed Great Lakes Downs in November 2007 after years of financial losses.

== Physical attributes ==
The track was a one-mile dirt oval, with plans to build a 7/8-mile turf course by 2010.

The track opened with a 1,000-seat temporary grandstand, with a 4,000-seat permanent grandstand expected to be complete by 2010.

Both of these projected upgrades never started.

== Racing ==
The inaugural season of thoroughbred racing started July 18, 2008, ending November 2, 2008. The long-term plans call for racing annually from March through November, with the Michigan Derby for three-year-olds running in April, as a prep race for the Kentucky Derby.

In 2010 live racing was cut to Saturdays and Sundays only, 44 days in all, due to a budget reduction in the state's racing commission. The track also has reportedly not paid many of their bills in 2010 and had their utilities cut-off for a time and as of February 2011 their website was down.

On Nov. 3, 2010, Pinnacle Race Course surrendered its license back to the state of Michigan due to mounting financial problems. After doing so, the race track suspended all operations, giving no word on whether they would re-open or not. As of April 1, 2011, foreclosure proceedings are now in effect. Notices signifying such a situation are now prominently displayed on doors and windows of the building.

By 2014, the track permanently closed and was demolished in 2016.
