= Evelyn Daniel Anderson =

American educator and activist (1926–1998)

- Anderson from a 1948 newspaper
- Born: August 2, 1926; Greensboro, Alabama, U.S.
- Died: October 7, 1998 (aged 72); Tuscaloosa, Alabama, U.S.
- Occupation: Educator

Evelyn Daniel Anderson (August 2, 1926 – October 7, 1998) was an American educator and advocate for physically disabled people.

== Early life and education ==
Anderson was the daughter of Dr. Thomas J. Anderson and Frances Daniel Anderson of Greensboro, Alabama. She was hit by a stray bullet at the age of four, became paraplegic, and used a gurney or a wheelchair for the rest of her life. In 1948, she graduated with a degree in art and history from Judson College. While she was a student at Judson, she was an officer in the Judson chapter of the Sigma Delta Pi honor society. In 1964, Anderson earned a master's degree from the University of Alabama.

== Career ==
In 1948, she began teaching art unofficially at a high school in Greensboro; an Alabama law at the time prohibited severely disabled persons from teaching. She inspired a new law in 1953 that overturned this restriction. In 1954, she became the first seriously disabled educator to be hired by an Alabama public school. She taught English and Spanish, and after 1964 also served as a guidance counselor, at Greensboro High School. She retired from teaching in 1982.

Anderson motivated the city of Greensboro to make changes to accommodate people with physical disabilities, and was a founding member of the Greensboro Friends of the Library. In 1977, she served on the Alabama Governor's Committee on Employment of the Handicapped. Anderson won many awards including Outstanding Educator in 1974, Alabama's Outstanding Counselor of the Year for 1975–76, the 1977 Judson College Alumnae Achievement Award, and the Alabama Handicapped Professional Woman of the Year in 1977. In 2011, she was inducted into the Alabama Women's Hall of Fame.

== Personal life ==
Anderson lived with her parents, and later with her father and stepmother. In 1956, she vacationed in Cuba with her parents and brother. Her mother died in 1957. Evelyn Daniel Anderson died in Tuscaloosa following a short illness in 1998, aged 72 years.
