= The All-Star Buglers =

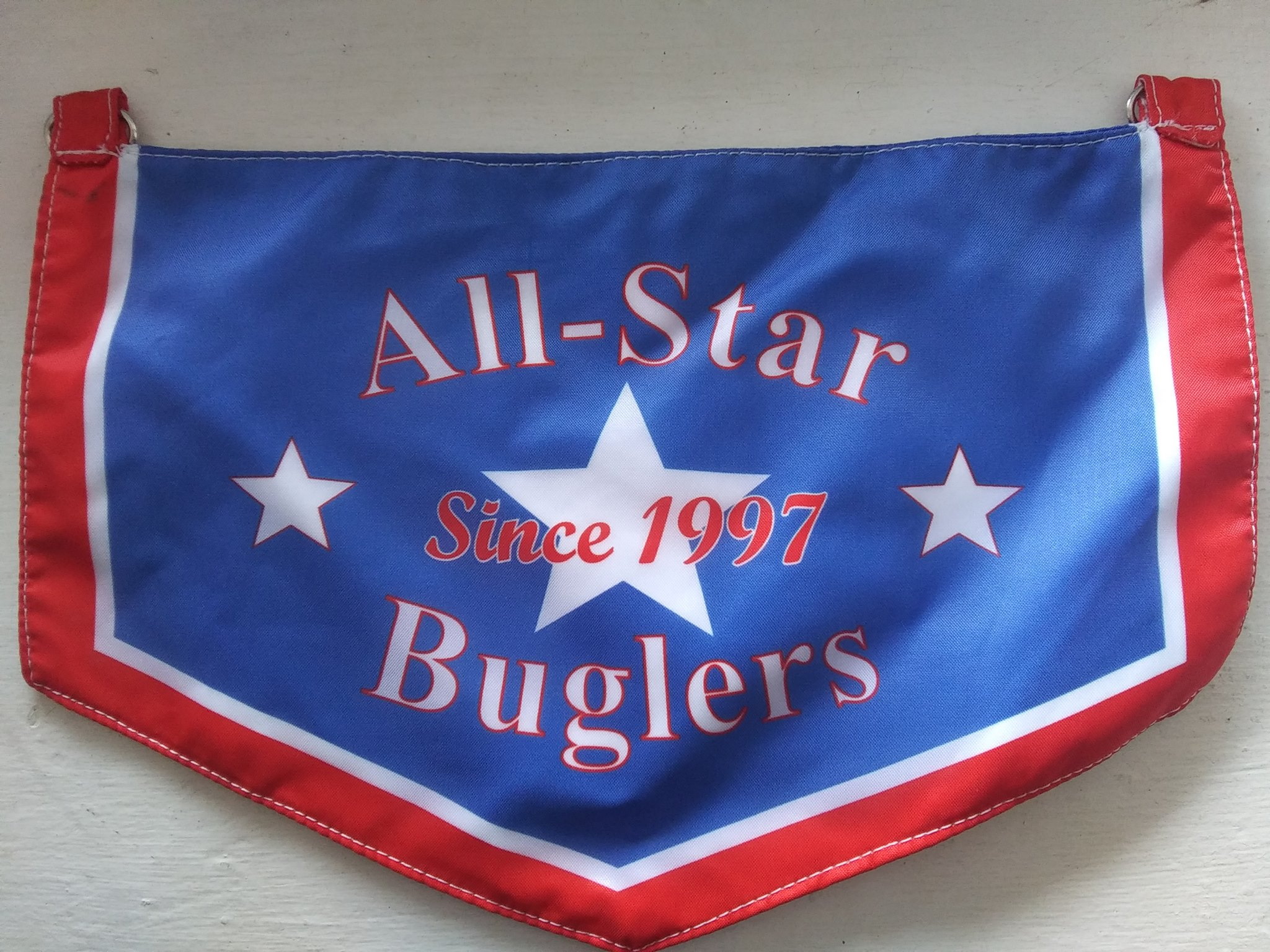

Background information
- Origin: Glenolden, PA, U.S.
- Genres: Jazz; Classical; Popular
- Years active: 1997–2019

The All-Star Buglers were a famous trumpet ensemble formed by former New York Racing Association bugler Mark O'Keeffe. The group featured official track buglers from across the United States performing the traditional First call at prestigious horse racing events.

== Overview ==
- Founded by Mark O'Keeffe in July 1997 at Delaware Park Racetrack.
- Performed 271 times at major horse racing events, MLB games, television appearances and many private events between 1997 and 2019.
- Employed over 40 distinct musicians (mostly trumpet players), helping launch or boost the careers of many race track buglers.
- Performed at 34 race tracks in 18 states and Canada.

== History ==
The All-Star Buglers were formed on a whim at Delaware Park Racetrack in time for the running of the 1997 Delaware Handicap. Management suggested a "dueling buglers" gimmick with O'Keeffe dueling another bugler all day long. O'Keeffe countered with an offer of a bugler trio composed of official race track buglers in their respective race track uniforms. Buglers Frank Hughes from Monmouth Park and Sam Grossman from Belmont Park were recruited and joined O'Keeffe in performances of fanfares and popular melodies in addition to the traditional First call in 3-part harmony prior to each race. The group would usually reserve the fanfares and melodies for featured stakes races on the day's racing program, but in later years the group could be found wandering the grandstand on occasion, performing popular tunes for the racing patrons.

== Performances ==
=== The Breeders' Cup (G1) ===
In 1998, The All-Star Buglers were invited by The Breeders' Cup to perform at Churchill Downs for the 15th running of the Breeders' Cup. Buglers Sam Grossman from Belmont Park and Jay Cohen from Santa Anita Park joined Delaware Park Racetrack bugler Mark O'Keeffe in the first performance ever by a trumpet ensemble at the Breeders' Cup. Subsequent performances at The Breeders' Cup include:

- 1999 at Gulfstream Park
- 2000 at Churchill Downs
- 2001 at Belmont Park
- 2005 at Belmont Park
- 2006 at Churchill Downs
- 2007 at Monmouth Park (2 Days)
- 2008 at Santa Anita Park (2 Days)

=== The Belmont Stakes (G1) ===
In June of 2000, The All-Star Buglers were contracted to perform at the Belmont Stakes. This was the first time a trumpet ensemble had ever performed at a Triple Crown event. Mark O'Keeffe, Sam Grossman and Jay Cohen were joined on this day by Churchill Downs bugler Steve Buttleman. (Buttleman would later go on to perform at the 2018 Preakness Stakes, making him the only bugler to perform at all 3 Triple Crown events.) Subsequent performances at The Belmont Stakes include:

- 2001
- 2002
- 2003
- 2006

=== The Meadowlands ===
In 2001, The All-Star Buglers were contracted to perform at the Meadowlands Racetrack for the most prestigious event on the harness racing calendar - the Hambletonian. This began a 20 year relationship with the Meadowlands Racetrack, with the group also frequently performing at the Meadowlands Pace and the Breeders' Crown.

=== Other racing events ===
- Pennsylvania Derby (1997,1998,2004,2012-2019,)
- Ocala Breeders' Championships (1998-2010)
- Florida Derby (1998,2001,2002,2003,2005,2006)
- Tampa Bay Derby (1998-2004,2006,2007)
- West Virginia Derby (1999)
- Santa Anita Handicap (1999-2000)
- Oaklawn Handicap (1999)
- Arkansas Derby (2000-2001)
- Ohio Derby (2005-2006)
- Maryland Million Day (2005,2007,2008)
- West Virginia Breeders Classic (2006-2016)
- Haskell Invitational (2006)
- Malibu Stakes (2007)

=== The Late Show with David Letterman ===
On August 8, 2003 at 3 o'clock in the afternoon, The All-Star Buglers received a call from Jill Lederman, producer at The Late Show with David Letterman inviting The All-Star Buglers to perform that night on the show. Taping began at 5PM and only 2 buglers were available to do the show. Atlantic City Race Course bugler Richard Garrick joined Mark O'Keeffe for this performance at the Ed Sullivan Theater.

=== Major League Baseball ===
On March 6, 2006 The All-Star Buglers gave their first performance of The Star Spangled Banner at a Major League Baseball game, a spring training event at Progress Energy Park between the Boston Red Sox and the Tampa Bay Devil Rays. Subsequent performances include:

- 7/30/2006 at Citizens Bank Park - Florida Marlins vs Philadelphia Phillies
- 3/31/2007 at Tropicana Field (Spring Training) - NY Mets vs. Tampa Bay Devil Rays
- 8/10/2007 at Citizens Bank Park - Atlanta Braves vs. Philadelphia Phillies
- 3/10/2008 at Tropicana Field (Spring Training) - Cleveland Indians vs Tampa Bay Devil Rays
- 7/06/2008 at Citizens Bank Park - NY Mets vs Philadelphia Phillies
- 9/03/2009 at Citizens Bank Park - San Francisco Giants vs Philadelphia Phillies

=== Other Performances ===
Off track, The All-Star Buglers were active playing at horse racing related award ceremonies, auctions, grand openings, track closures and parades as well as weddings and church services, occasionally performing as a brass ensemble.

=== Summary ===
In total, The All-Star Buglers performed 271 times with 235 of those performances at major horse racing events held at 34 race tracks in 18 states and Canada. The group drew from buglers employed at Belmont Park, Monmouth Park, Atlantic City Race Course, Santa Anita Park, Hollywood Park Racetrack, Churchill Downs, Tampa Bay Downs, Lone Star Park, Sam Houston Race Park, Emerald Downs, Oaklawn Park, Ak-Sar-Ben (arena), Meadowlands Racetrack, Hialeah Park, Calder Race Course and Gulfstream Park as well as other free lance musicians. The group covered the entire spectrum of horse racing, performing at thoroughbred, harness, quarter horse, steeplechase and Arabian events.

=== Discontinuation ===
With dwindling opportunities and the onset of COVID-19, the group ceased operations in 2019.
