= Olympic Regional Development Authority =

Public benefit corporation in New York

Agency overview
- Formed: July 31, 1981
- Jurisdiction: Management and promotion of three winter sports facilities: Lake Placid Olympic facilities, Gore Mountain, and Belleayre Mountain
- Headquarters: NYS Olympic Regional Development Authority Olympic Center 2634 Main St. Lake Placid, New York 12946; 44.28463°N 73.98460°W
- Agency executive: Ashley Walden, President and CEO
- Website: www.orda.org

The Olympic Regional Development Authority (ORDA) is a New York State public benefit corporation, created by the State of New York to manage the facilities used after the 1980 Olympic Winter Games at Lake Placid, New York.

ORDA is the only state-owned ski area organization in the United States. Destinations they operate include Whiteface Mountain, Gore Mountain, and Belleayre Mountain. ORDA operates the Olympic Center which houses ice skating, museum, event space, and offices for ORDA. It also operates the Olympic Sports Complex and Mount Van Hoevenberg located five miles from Lake Placid and the Olympic Ski Jumping Complex.

== History ==
On July 1, 1981, the New York State legislature created ORDA to maintain and operate all the Olympic sites of Lake Placid after the final 1980 Winter Olympics.

In 1984 ORDA acquired Gore Mountain and added it to its portfolio.

In 2012 Belleayre was transferred from the New York Department of Environmental Conservation to ORDA.

== Organization ==
ORDA's consists of its President and CEO Michael Pratt along with 12 board of directors, they are:

- Kelly Cummings, Board Chair
- Bill Beaney
- Cliff Donaldson
- Eric Gertler (Designee - Steve Hunt)
- Thomas Keegan
- Andy Lack
- Art Lussi
- Betty Little
- Diane Munro
- Erik Kulleseid (Designee - Chris Pushkarsh)
- Basil Seggos (Designee - Jeff Stefanko)
- Elinor Tatum

== See also ==
- Adirondack Park Agency
- Agriculture & New York State Horse Breeding Development Fund
- Development Authority of the North Country
- Hudson River–Black River Regulating District
- New York Racing Association
- New York State Thoroughbred Breeding and Development Fund Corporation
- Ogdensburg Bridge and Port Authority
- United Nations Development Corporation
