= Unionville, Pennsylvania =

Unionville is the name of several places in the U.S. state of Pennsylvania:

- Unionville, Beaver County, Pennsylvania, an unincorporated community and census designated place
- Unionville, Berks County, Pennsylvania
- Unionville, Butler County, Pennsylvania, an unincorporated community and census designated place
- Unionville, Centre County, Pennsylvania, a borough
- Unionville, Chester County, Pennsylvania, an unincorporated community and census designated place
- Unionville, Montgomery County, Pennsylvania
- Neffs, Pennsylvania in Lehigh County, historically called Unionville
