= New York State Gaming Commission =

Governing body of gambling in New York

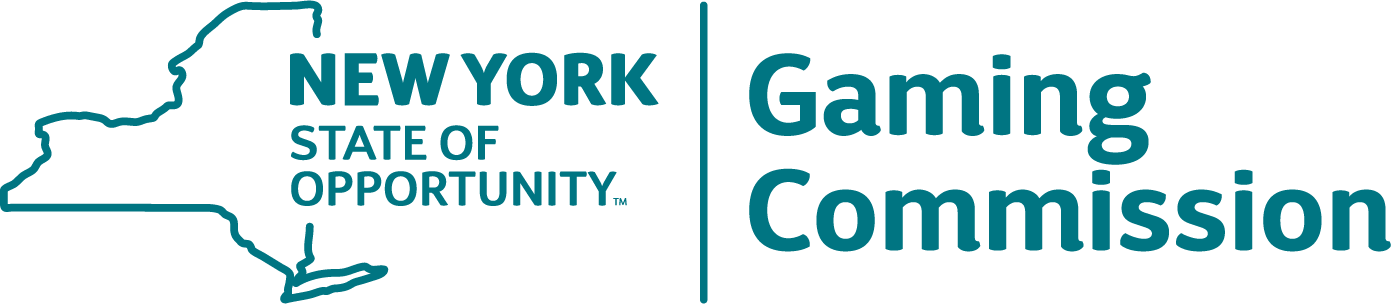

Agency overview
- Formed: February 1, 2013
- Jurisdiction: New York
- Headquarters: New York State Gaming Commission; One Broadway Center; Schenectady, New York 12301-7500
- Agency executives: Robert Williams, Executive Director; Brian O'Dwyer, Chair
- Website: gaming.ny.gov

The New York State Gaming Commission is the official governing body that oversees casino gaming, charitable gaming, horse racing, lottery, and video lottery terminals in New York State. Based in Schenectady, it was formed on February 1, 2013, upon the merger of the New York State Racing and Wagering Board, and the New York Lottery. It is part of the New York State Executive Department.

As of June 2023, the members of the commission are:

- Brian O'Dwyer, Chair
- Martin J. Mack
- John A. Crotty
- Peter J. Moschetti, Jr.
- Marissa Shorenstein
- Jerry Skurnik
- Sylvia Hamer

The Executive Director of the Commission is Robert Williams, who was formerly in charge of the state lottery division.

In January 2022 a new state law in New York went into effect banning the slaughter of race horses in New York. The law also requires racehorses and breed horses to be microchipped.

With four full-scale casinos operating in the state; on December 15, 2025, the Commission granted the first three gaming licenses for proposed full-service casinos in New York City. The three approved casino projects are a $4 billion casino at the Ferry Point Park golf course in the Bronx by Bally's; a $5 billion expansion of Resort World's existing Aqueduct Racetrack slots parlor in Jamaica, Queens to a full casino; and the $8 billion Hard Rock Hotel & Casino Metropolitan Park, next to Citi Field in Queens, as a joint venture of Hard Rock International and New York Mets owner Steve Cohen.

== See also ==
- New York Racing Association
