= Great Lakes Downs =

Horse racing track in Michigan, US

Great Lakes Downs was a 5/8 mile horse racing track located near Fruitport, Muskegon County, Michigan. The facility, originally known as Muskegon Race Course, hosted thoroughbred horse racing events for several years after a major renovation in 1999.

In January 2000 the track was purchased by Magna International Corporation who operated the facility until the track closed in November 2007 and was demolished in 2008.
