= New York State Thoroughbred Breeding and Development Fund Corporation =

New York State Thoroughbred Breeding and Development Fund

New York State public benefit corporation overview
- Formed: 1973
- Jurisdiction: Promotion by funding of the breeding of thoroughbred racehorses and to preserve New York’s farmland
- Headquarters: One Broadway Center 1st Floor; Schenectady, New York 12305
- New York State public benefit corporation executives: Tracy Egan, Executive Director; Brian O'Dwyer, Chair
- Website: www.nybreds.com

The New York State Thoroughbred Breeding and Development Fund Corporation is a New York State public-benefit corporation whose purpose is to dispose and distribute monies received for the purposes of advancement and promotion of breeding and raising thoroughbreds in N.Y.S., promotion of equine research, various awards to owners and breeders of N.Y.S. thoroughbreds for finishing 1st, 2nd, 3rd, or 4th in races, and providing of purse monies for races exclusively for New York Breeds. The fund was established in 1973 and has paid out more than $17 million annually in breeder, owner and stallion owner awards, and in purse enrichment to the state’s tracks.

== Funding ==
The incentives provided by the Fund are financed from within the racing industry, using a small percentage of the total monies wagered through the pari-mutuel system on thoroughbred racing in New York State. The Fund also obtains revenue from a small percentage of Video Lottery Terminal (VLT) monies from the Resorts World Casino NY at Aqueduct, and from VLTs at Finger Lakes Race Track.

== Organization ==
The fund has 10 members on its board of directors. In 2017, it had operating expenses of $19.5 million and a staff of 7 people. Former news broadcaster in the capital region, Tracy Egan, is the fund's Executive Director. In 2022, Governor Kathy Hochul named Brian O'Dwyer Chair of the Board.

== See also ==
- Agriculture & New York State Horse Breeding Development Fund
- New York Racing Association
- Olympic Regional Development Authority
