= Howard Kissel =

American theater critic

Howard William Kissel (October 29, 1942 – February 24, 2012) was an American theater critic based in New York City. Before serving as the chief theatre critic for the Daily News for twenty years, Kissel was the arts editor for Women's Wear Daily. He also wrote a column for The Huffington Post. Kissel also authored a biography on theater producer David Merrick, entitled David Merrick, the Abominable Showman, which was published in 1993.

Kissel was born on October 29, 1942, in Milwaukee, Wisconsin, and attended Shorewood High School. He graduated from Columbia University in 1964 and obtained his master's from Northwestern University. He was married to Christine Buck from 1974 until her death in 2006. Kissel died in Manhattan on February 24, 2012, aged 69. According to his sister, he had been suffering from health complications following a liver transplant in 2010.
