= New York Racing Association =

American not-for-profit corporation

The New York Racing Association, Inc.
- Abbreviation: NYRA
- Founded: April 28, 1955; 71 years ago
- Founders: John Wesley Hanes II, Christopher Chenery, Harry F. Guggenheim
- Location: Jamaica, Queens, New York City, U.S.
- Chairman: Marc Holliday
- CEO, President: David O'Rourke
- Website: nyra.com
- Formerly called: The Greater New York Association

The New York Racing Association, Inc. (NYRA) is the not-for-profit corporation that operates the two largest Thoroughbred horse racing tracks in the state of New York, United States: Belmont Park in Elmont and Saratoga Race Course in Saratoga Springs.

Racing at NYRA tracks is year-round, operating at Belmont Park from May to mid-July and from Labor Day through April and Saratoga Race Course from mid-July through Labor Day.

The New York Racing Association is the successor to the Greater New York Association, a non-profit racing association created in 1955. NYRA is separate from the governing body that oversees racing in New York, currently the New York State Gaming Commission.

The New York City Police Department is the primary policing and investigation agency within New York City as per the NYC Charter. They respond to all incidents that occur at NYRA facilities.

== History ==
In 1913, racing returned to New York after a hiatus due to the Hart–Agnew Law. Only four tracks had survived the hiatus: Aqueduct Racetrack, Belmont Park, Jamaica Racetrack and Saratoga Race Course. In 1955, the tracks came under common ownership with the creation of a non-profit association known as the Greater New York Association. The partnership became the New York Racing Association (NYRA) on April 10, 1958.

The NYRA remodeled Aqueduct Racetrack, Belmont Park, and Saratoga Race Course, while Jamaica was demolished in 1959, which is now the Rochdale Village housing development. Later, Belmont Park was closed from 1963 to 1968 in order to construct a new grandstand.

Off-track betting in New York was established in 1970, being offered by regional, government-owned corporations. OTB parlors began showing live video feeds of races, referred to as simulcasting, in 1984. In 1995, NYRA launched a cable television channel and a telephone advance-deposit wagering service.

From December 2003 through September 2005, NYRA operated under a deferred prosecution agreement following a 2003 federal indictment. The charges related alleged income tax evasion and money laundering by mutuel clerks between 1980 and 1999 with the knowledge of NYRA middle managers. Under the agreement, NYRA paid $3 million to the government and its implementation of new cash-handling procedures designed to eliminate corruption and mismanagement was monitored by a New York law firm. After receiving a report from the monitor which concluded that NYRA was in compliance with the new guidelines, the Justice Department moved to dismiss the indictment and its motion was allowed by a federal judge.

NYRA, claiming that the state lottery division's failure to approve the installation of video-lottery terminal (VLT) machines at Aqueduct Racetrack pushed it to insolvency, filed for Chapter 11 bankruptcy protection on November 2, 2006. The association emerged from bankruptcy protection September 12, 2008 with incorporation of a successor corporation, New York Racing Association Inc. On February 13, 2008, NYRA was reorganized and its franchise to operate the three racetracks was extended through 2033 under legislation approved by the New York state legislature. The new authorization provided $105 million in direct state aid and forgave millions more in state loans to NYRA. The association also gave up its claim to ownership of the land on which the three racetracks are situated. In return, the state gained expanded oversight responsibility. The state comptroller won the power to audit NYRA's books. The conversion of NYRA from a non-profit association to a not-for-profit corporation also gave the state attorney general enhanced oversight authority. In addition, the state now appoints 11 of the corporation's 25 directors. By changing from non-profit to not-for-profit status, NYRA also gained flexibility in its financial management.

New York City's OTB Corporation shut down permanently in 2010.

In 2016, NYRA launched an online advance-deposit wagering platform under the brand NYRA Bets, which offers live bets and live simulcasts, and is available on multiple states.

In 2022, the NYRA announced plans to shut down Aqueduct Racetrack and move its meets to Belmont Park, which would be upgraded to allow year-round operations. Aqueduct held its last races in June 2026.

== Racetrack and TV personalities ==
=== Current ===
- Acacia Clement (2022–present)
- Andy Serling (2008–present) — American television personality who works as a television analyst for all three NYRA tracks and also makes appearances on HRTV daily for his handicapping insights. A native of Saratoga Springs, New York, Serling began following horse racing as a child. For many years he worked at the New York Stock Exchange as an options trader before being hired by NYRA full-time in 2008. He is known as a trenchant and highly opinionated analyst. He is also a regular guest and the Monday host of Daily Racing Form's handicapping seminars at Siro's during the Saratoga race meeting.
- Paul Verderosa (2023–present)
- Maggie Wolfendale (2010–present)

=== Previous ===
- Jason Blewitt (2006–2016) — Blewitt graduated from Long Island University, C. W. Post with a degree in journalism. He was a regular co-host of Talking Horses, a daily handicapping show at NYRA tracks. He was also a frequent guest on New York City Off Track Betting Corporation's Thoroughbred Central.
- Paul Corman (1995–1999)
- Eric Donovan (2006–present) — worked on the NYRA press staff since 1999 and was the full-time oddsmaker for all three New York Racing Association tracks from 2005 to 2017. He was also the co-host of NYRA's daily handicapping show, Talking Horses. Donovan, who frequently substituted in recent years, took over for Don LaPlace, who set the morning line from 1981-1995, then again from 2000-2004.
- Kelly Gecewicz (2000–2005)
- John Imbriale (1979–2023), also served as the full-time racecaller at the NYRA tracks from 2020 to 2022.
- Rich McCarthy (1995–1999)
- Harvey Pack (1995–1998)
- Mary Ryan (1995–1999)
- Jan Rushton (1995–2009)
- Michael Sherack (1995–2000)
- Anthony Stabile (2016–2023)
- Travis Stone (2014–2017)
- John M. Veitch (1995–1999)
- Mike Watchmaker (1995–1998)

=== Track announcers ===
- Fred Capossela (1940-1971 @ Jamaica, Belmont Park, Saratoga & Aqueduct)
- Dave Johnson (1972-1977 @ Aqueduct, Belmont Park and Saratoga)
- Chic Anderson (1977-1979 @ Aqueduct and Belmont Park)
- Marshall Cassidy (1977-1978 @ Saratoga)
- Marshall Cassidy (1979-1990 @ Aqueduct, Belmont Park and Saratoga)
- Frank Dwyer (assistant announcer 1979-1992 @Aqueduct, Belmont Park and Saratoga)
- John Imbriale (assistant announcer 1979-2019 @Aqueduct, Belmont Park and Saratoga)
- Tom Durkin (1990-2014 @Aqueduct, Belmont Park and Saratoga)
- John G. Dooley (assistant announcer 1996-1997 @Aqueduct, Belmont Park and Saratoga)
- Travis Stone (assistant announcer 2014 @ Aqueduct)
- Larry Collmus (2015-2019 @Aqueduct, Belmont Park and Saratoga)
- Frank Mirahmadi (assistant announcer 2017-2022)
- John Imbriale (2020-2022) (then seasonal announcer 2022-2024)
- Chris Griffin (assistant announcer @ Aqueduct 2021-2022)
- Frank Mirahmadi (2023-present @ Saratoga)
- Chris Griffin (2023-2026 @ Aqueduct) and Belmont Park (2023-present)

=== Track buglers ===
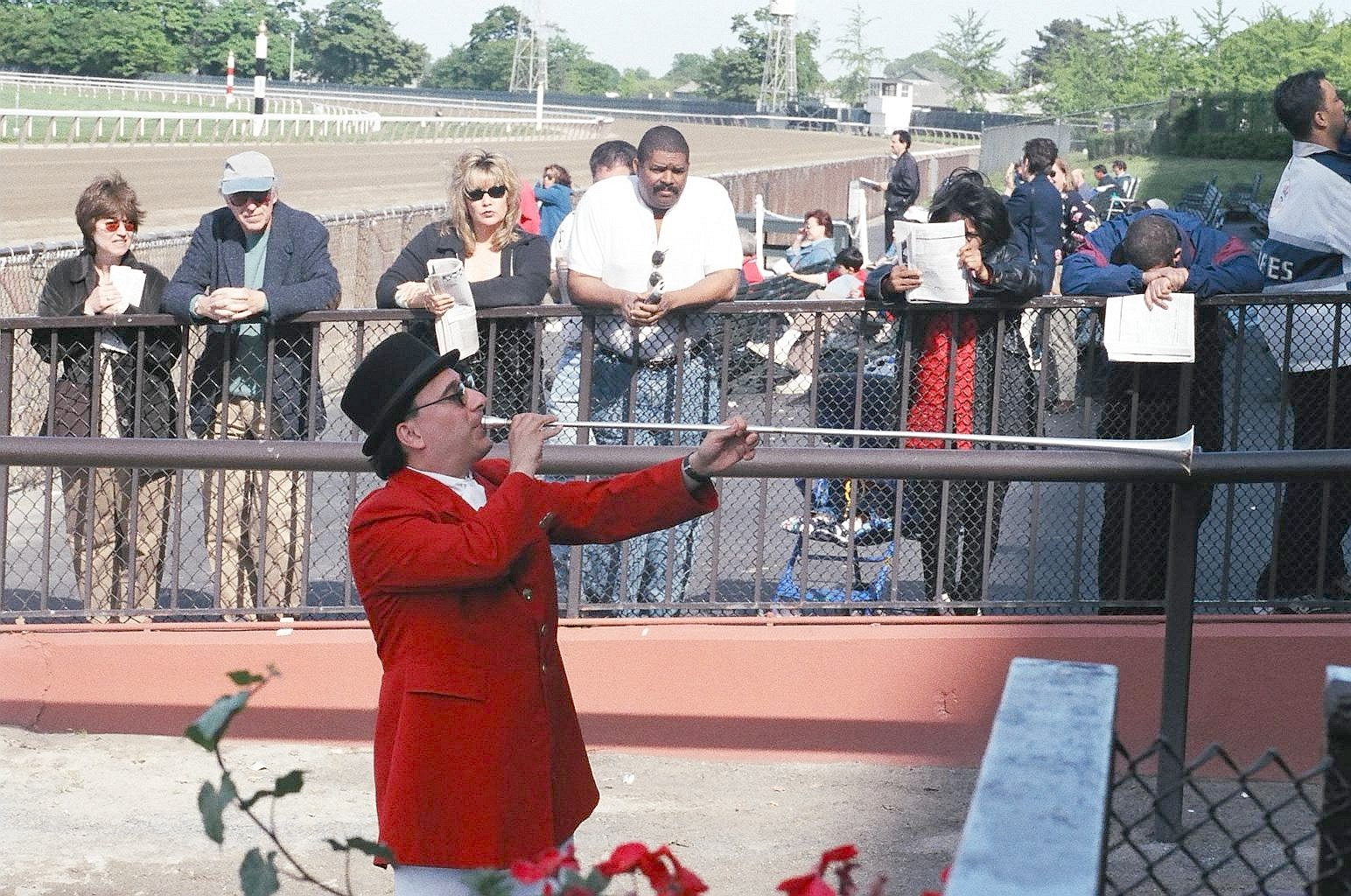
Sam Grossman plays "Call to the Post" at Belmont Park in 1999.

- Wilcox (1905 @ Belmont Park)
- William "Billy" Grey (1906-1940 @ Jamaica, Belmont Park and Saratoga)
- Karl E. Rissland (1940-1959 @ Jamaica, Belmont Park, Saratoga and Aqueduct)
- Vincent Castelli (1960-1962 @ Saratoga)
- Sam Koza (1960-July 1987 @ Aqueduct and Belmont Park)
- Robert Shields Bruce (1963-1971 @ Saratoga)
- Steven Anthony (Garzyski) (1972-1974 @ Saratoga)
- John Hemmingford (1975-1976 @ Saratoga)
- Sam Koza (1977-1987 @ Saratoga)
- Mark O'Keeffe (September 1987 - December 1992 @ Aqueduct and Belmont Park)
- Katherine "Kitty" Hopkins (1988-1991 @ Saratoga)
- Brian Bailey (July 1992-Sept.2002 @ Saratoga)
- VACANT (January 1993 - April 1993 @ Aqueduct and Belmont Park)
- Sam Grossman (April 1993 - August 2018 @ Aqueduct and Belmont Park)
- Sam Grossman (2003-2018 @ Saratoga)
- VACANT (Sept. 2019-2020 @ Aqueduct, Belmont Park & Saratoga)
- Sam Grossman (2021 @ Saratoga)
- Tony Gambaro (2022 - present @ Saratoga)
- Carson Gambaro (assistant bugler 2022 - present @ Saratoga)

In 2000, The New York Racing Association contracted The All-Star Buglers to perform at The Belmont Stakes and other special events. The All-Star Buglers were a group of official track buglers from all over the country formed by former NYRA bugler Mark O'Keeffe. Performances at Belmont Park included:

- Belmont Stakes (2000)
- Memorial Service for Chris Antley (2001)
- Belmont Stakes (2001)
- All-Star Announcer and Bugler Day (2001)
- Breeders' Cup (2001)
- Belmont Stakes Festival and Parade (2002)
- Acorn Stakes (2002)
- Belmont Stakes (2002)
- Belmont Stakes Festival and Parade (2003)
- Belmont Stakes (2003)
- Breeders' Cup (2005)
- Belmont Stakes (2006)

In subsequent years, the New York Racing Association employed various trumpet ensembles led by NYRA bugler Sam Grossman for special horse racing events like The Belmont Stakes and The Travers Stakes.

== Law enforcement ==
NYRA Peace Officer Patch

NYRA maintains its own law enforcement force of more than 300 sworn employees, including plainclothed investigators, inspectors, and fire marshals, all of whom are New York State Peace Officers. These officers must be licensed with the state Gaming Commission and meet requirements set forth by the Division of Criminal Justice Services.

NYRA peace officers may make arrests and issue summonses on NYRA property only. They carry weapons such as a baton, pepper spray, and handcuffs. Some carry a firearm. They wear eagle-top shields, typically gold in color. Uniformed members wear navy-blue uniforms with gold on white NYRA patches on their left side and an American flag patch on the right side. NYRA inspectors wear the shields but no further uniforms.

After training in an in-house academy, NYRA Peace Officers are assigned to the Patrol or Backstretch divisions. Patrol officers are the everyday face of the department to the general public, conducting patrols and enforcing the law during meets and events at all three NYRA facilities. Backstretch officers conduct patrols and enforce the law in the backstretch areas such as the on-property residences of NYRA staff and some riders. Each division's officers are covered by its own union representation derived from two separate union organizations.

NYRA Sergeants and lower-ranking Peace Officers are paid hourly rates. Investigators, lieutenants, and higher-ranking members receive annual salaries.

NYRA also seasonally employs New York State-licensed security officers at Saratoga Racecourse during its racing meets and subcontracts private security guard companies to help at the Belmont Stakes and other events downstate. NYRA Security Officers wear light blue or white shirts with security patches on both arms. Contractors wear their security company's patches and logos while working. Neither has power beyond that of a normal citizen's rights under New York state law's citizen's arrest procedures as well as report to assist and make arrests on the orders of a sworn NYRA peace officer.

Sworn officer rank	Insignia	Fire marshal rank †	Insignia
Director		Chief Fire Marshal	
Chief of Law Enforcement / Security		Assistant Chief Fire Marshal	
Inspector (Investigation Supervisors)	None		
Captain		Fire Marshal Captain	
Lieutenant		Fire Marshal Lieutenant	
Sergeant	(sleeve)	Fire Marshal Sergeant	(sleeve)
Investigator	None		
Peace Officer	"NYRA" Collar Pins	Deputy Fire Marshal	"NYRA" Collar Pins
Security Officer †	"NYRA" Collar Pins		

†: Uniformed rank that has no authority to carry any weapons or firearms

== See also ==
- Agriculture & New York State Horse Breeding Development Fund
- New York State Thoroughbred Breeding and Development Fund Corporation
