= Agriculture & New York State Horse Breeding Development Fund =

US public-benefit corporation

New York State public benefit corporation overview
- Formed: 1965
- Jurisdiction: Administration of the New York Sire Stakes races, Excelsior/State Fair Series races, and County Fair Races
- Headquarters: One Broadway Ctr. Schenectady, NY 12305
- New York State public benefit corporation executive: Ron Ochrym, Acting Executive Director
- Website: www.nysirestakes.com

The Agriculture & New York State Horse Breeding Development Fund is the public-benefit corporation responsible for administering the New York Sire Stakes.

The Agriculture & New York State Horse Breeding Development Fund was established in 1965 to promote the breeding of horses and the conduct of equine research within New York State. As part of its mission, the fund administers the state's Sire Stake's program, provides assistance to county agricultural societies, and provides annual grants to the statewide 4H program as well as the Zweig Fund for Equine Research. It also administers the Excelsior/State Fair Series races and County Fair Races.

== Organization ==
In 2017, it had operating expenses of $16.27 million and a staff of one person. There is a 5-member board overseeing its operations.

== About the New York Sire Stakes ==
The New York Sire Stakes is New York State's harness racing program specifically designed for New York–bred horses. Pari-mutuel races are held at all of New York State's harness tracks. Additional non-pari-mutuel races are held at participating New York State County Fairs.

Laws of New York, PML

== See also ==
- New York State Thoroughbred Breeding and Development Fund Corporation
- New York Racing Association
- Olympic Regional Development Authority
