= Clarence Jones (American football) =

American football player (born 1968)

No. 68, 72, 74, 75
- Position: Offensive tackle

Personal information
- Born: May 6, 1968 (age 58); Brooklyn, New York, U.S.
- Listed height: 6 ft 6 in (1.98 m)
- Listed weight: 300 lb (136 kg)

Career information
- High school: Central Islip (Central Islip, New York)
- College: Maryland
- NFL draft: 1991: 4th round, 111th overall pick

Career history
- New York Giants (1991–1993); Los Angeles / St. Louis Rams (1994–1995); New Orleans Saints (1996–1998); Carolina Panthers (1999–2000)

Career NFL statistics
- Games played: 111
- Games started: 88
- Fumble recoveries: 3
- Stats at Pro Football Reference

Clarence Thomas Jones (born May 6, 1968) is an American former professional football player who was an offensive tackle in the National Football League (NFL). He played college football for the Maryland Terrapins and was selected by the New York Giants in the fourth round of the 1991 NFL draft. Jones also played for the Los Angeles / St. Louis Rams, New Orleans Saints, and Carolina Panthers.
