= Randy Beverly Jr. =

American football coach (born 1966)

- Born: Randy Beverly Jr. December 24, 1966 (age 59); Cape May, New Jersey, U.S.
- Education: University of California, Los Angeles
- Occupation: Federal Contractor
- Spouse: Lara Beverly
- Children: 3
- Parent: Randy Beverly

Randy Beverly Jr. (born December 24, 1966) is an American football head coach. He is a former head coach of the Rams Milano American Football Club, of the Italian Federation of American Football (FIDAF) and the Örebro Black Knights of the Swedish American Football Association. Randy Beverly Jr. is the son of Randy Beverly, former AFL and NFL defensive back for the New York Jets, the San Diego Chargers and the New England Patriots.

== Early life ==
Beverly was born in 1966, in Cape May, New Jersey. He is a graduate of University of California, Los Angeles, and a former Division 1-A defensive back and return specialist for the UCLA Bruins Football team.

In 1984, Beverly was nominated as the Top Football Player in Suffolk County, NY and also took the honors of First-Team All Long Island and National Consensus All-American quarterback, defensive back, and kick return specialist from Central Islip High School, New York. As an athlete in 1985, he gave a verbal commitment to attend and play for the University of Notre Dame but after the departure of head coach Gerry Faust, he signed a formal letter of intent to attend UCLA, and would later become team co-captain for the nationally ranked Rose Bowl and Pac-10 UCLA Bruins Championship teams from 1986 to 1989. Beverly's collegiate career includes a blocked kick and recovery for 17 yards in 1987 Aloha Bowl game against Emmitt Smith and the Florida Gators.

Beverly worked with NFL teams and coaching staffs, to include New York Jets, Minnesota Vikings, Oakland Raiders, and Cleveland Browns. In 2015, Beverly was inducted into the Central Islip, New York Sports Hall of Fame as the former Quarterback of a prolific Long Island football championship team in the 1980s.

== Career ==
Beverly successfully coached the Örebro Black Knights into the 2015 Superserien Championship Final, Super Bowl XXX, against the Carlstad Crusaders at the conclusion of the 2015 season. The Örebro Black Knights finished the season ranked 12th in Europe's Top 20 American Football Teams across Europe and the Americas. During the 2015 season, Sports Illustrated covered Beverly's success with the Örebro Black Knights.

In five seasons, from 2010 to 2014, Beverly has coached the Rams Milano Football Club into post-season playoff appearances four times. The Rams appeared in four FIF Italian League Championships, winning Super Bowls 33 and 35. During the 2014 season, in just the first four games under his leadership, the Rams offense amassed a scoring total of 233 points, averaging over 50 points per game. The Rams Defense held opponents scoreless in 2 of 4 games and scored 26 points from turn-overs.

Beverly currently serves the United States Government as a federal contractor based in Milan, Italy. He is also an accomplished video game designer and sports & entertainment technologies consultant in Europe. His gaming career began with the introduction of AI designs for Electronic Arts' franchise product, John Madden NFL Football.

In 2004, Beverly worked for the National Football League to assist in the creation of new training technologies and he is credited with building the first-ever virtual reality training program for sports. He also served as a consultant for major Hollywood Production studios. In 2007, Beverly co-founded an Eastern European gaming studio called Beast Studios.

== Personal life ==
Beverly lives with his wife Lara, an Italian native, and three children, Victoria, Stefania, and Fabio in Milan, Italy. Beverly was inducted into the Central Islip Sports Hall of Fame in 2015.
