= Andrew Tiller =

American football player (born 1989)

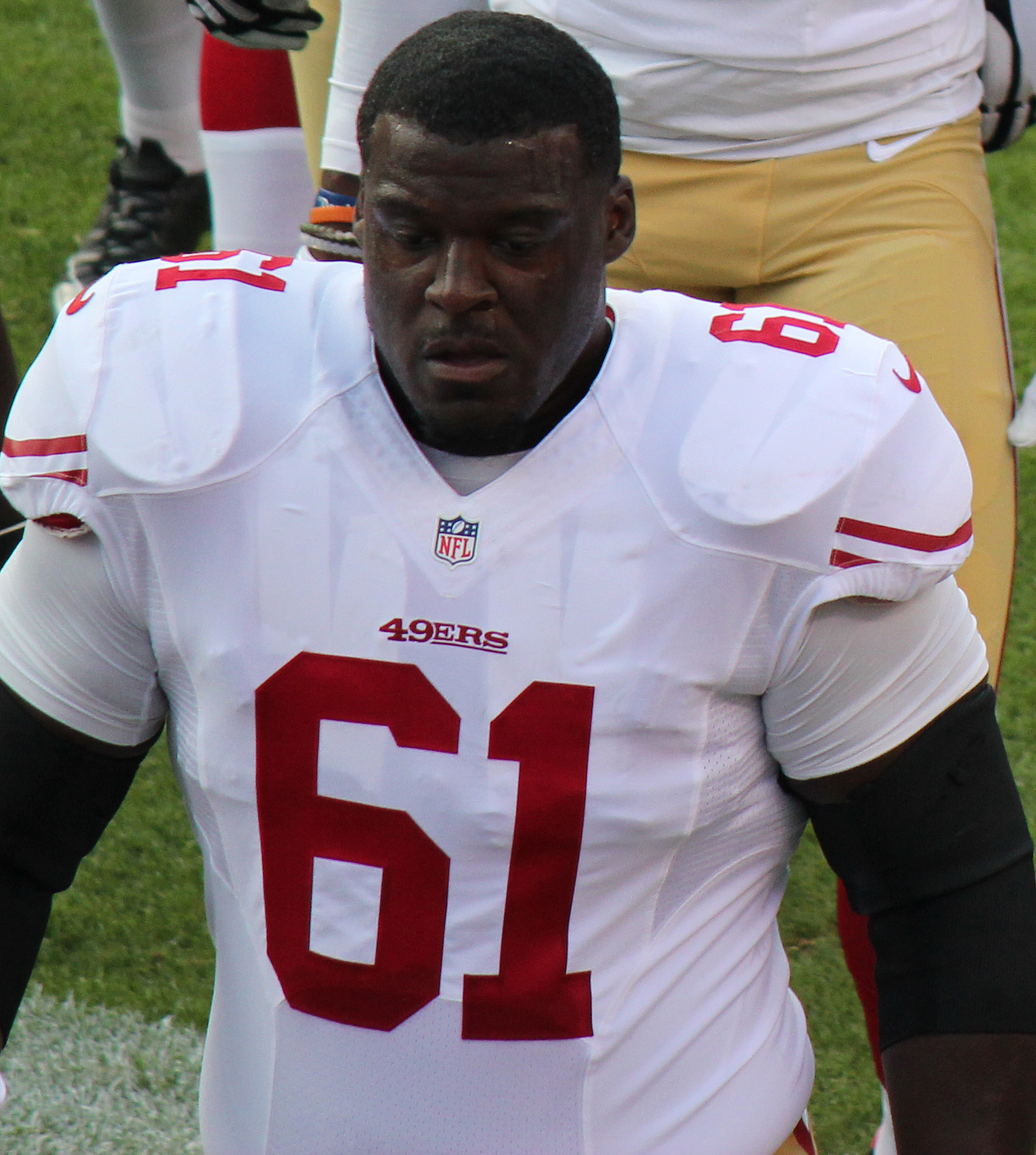
- Tiller with the San Francisco 49ers in 2015

No. 61, 75
- Position: Guard

Personal information
- Born: March 13, 1989 (age 37); Queens, New York, U.S.
- Listed height: 6 ft 4 in (1.93 m)
- Listed weight: 324 lb (147 kg)

Career information
- High school: Central Islip (Central Islip, New York)
- College: Syracuse
- NFL draft: 2012: 6th round, 179th overall pick

Career history
- New Orleans Saints (2012); San Diego Chargers (2013)*; Green Bay Packers (2013−2014)*; San Francisco 49ers (2014−2016); Kansas City Chiefs (2017)*; New Orleans Saints (2018)*; Orlando Apollos (2019); Tampa Bay Vipers (2020)
- * Offseason or practice squad member only

Awards and highlights
- First-team All-Big East (2011)

Career NFL statistics
- Games played: 28
- Games started: 14
- Stats at Pro Football Reference

Andrew J. Tiller (born March 13, 1989) is an American former professional football player who was a guard in the National Football League (NFL). He played college football for the Syracuse Orange.

== Early life ==
Tiller played guard at Central Islip Senior High School, where he graduated. In 2006, Tiller won Newsday's Zellner Award for being the best lineman in Suffolk County.

== College career ==
Tiller played his first two seasons at Nassau Community College where he became a 2008 Junior College Gridwire All-American. He then transferred to Syracuse University. During the 2009 season, Tiller started in 3 of 10 total games in his junior year. During the 2010 season, Tiller played in all 13 games and made notable contributions to the Orange football team. He finished his senior season in 2011 starting in all 12 games. His performances while in SU earned him three letters. While at Syracuse, Tiller was a Communications major.

== Professional career ==
=== New Orleans Saints (first stint) ===
Tiller was selected in the sixth round, 179th overall, by the New Orleans Saints in the 2012 NFL draft. He was released by the Saints on August 31, 2013.

=== San Diego Chargers ===
Tiller was signed by the San Diego Chargers to their practice squad on September 25, 2013, but was released on September 28, 2013. Tiller was re-signed to the Chargers' practice squad on October 1, 2013. On November 18, 2013, he was released by the Chargers.

=== Green Bay Packers ===
Tiller was signed to the practice squad of the Green Bay Packers on November 20, 2013. Tiller was released August 30, 2014.

=== San Francisco 49ers ===
Tiller was signed to the practice squad of the San Francisco 49ers on October 18, 2014. He was cut by the 49ers in order for the 49ers to make their 53-man roster. He was then signed to the 49ers' practice squad on September 6, 2015. In the middle of the season, he was signed to the 53-man roster and played two games alternating snaps with Jordan Devey.

=== Kansas City Chiefs ===
On May 10, 2017, Tiller signed with the Kansas City Chiefs. He was waived on September 2, 2017.

=== New Orleans Saints (second stint) ===
On January 4, 2018, Tiller signed a reserve/future contract with the Saints. He was released on September 1, 2018.

=== Orlando Apollos ===
In 2019, Tiller joined the Orlando Apollos of the Alliance of American Football. The league ceased operations in April 2019.

=== Tampa Bay Vipers ===
Tiller was selected in the 4th round in phase two in the 2020 XFL draft by the Tampa Bay Vipers. He was placed on injured reserve before the start of the regular season on February 1, 2020. He was activated from injured reserve on February 28, 2020. He had his contract terminated when the league suspended operations on April 10, 2020.
