= Off-track betting in New York =

Aspect of horse race betting

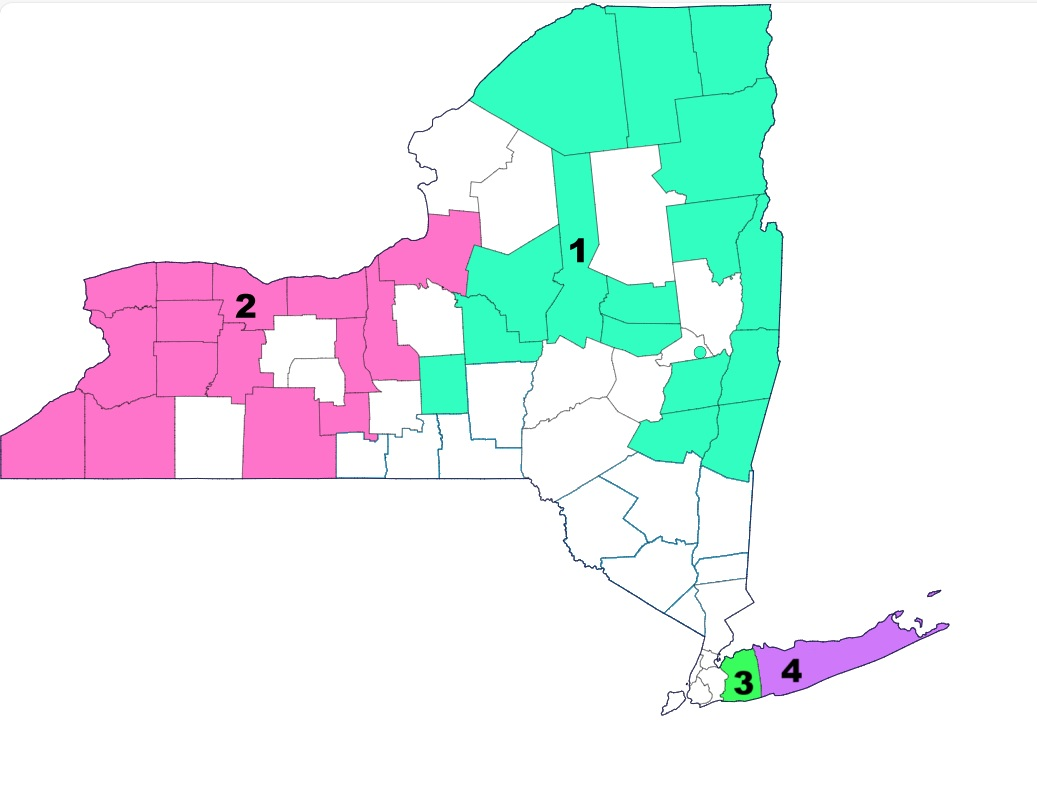
Map of the counties and cities that participate in each of the regional OTB corporations: 1. Capital OTB; 2. Western OTB; 3. Nassau OTB; 4. Suffolk OTB

In the U.S. state of New York, off-track betting on horse racing is offered by four regional, government-owned corporations. In 2016, they accepted a total of $558 million in bets.

== History ==
The New York State Legislature enacted its first off-track betting law in 1970, creating the New York City Off-Track Betting Corporation and allowing other municipalities to establish their own OTB operations. The law was meant to curb illegal bookmakers and provide a revenue source for state and local governments.

New York City OTB began taking bets in 1971. The City of Schenectady followed in 1972 with its own OTB operation.

The current system of regional OTB corporations was enacted in 1973 and parlors began showing live video feeds of races, referred to as simulcasting, in 1984.

== Current operations ==
As of 2026, off-track betting is offered by four regional corporations. Each corporation is a public benefit corporation, run by a board of directors who are appointed by the governments of the participating counties and cities. In addition to New York City, the ten counties that were once covered by Catskill OTB, thirteen other counties, Allegany, Delaware, Hamilton, Jefferson, Lewis, Onondaga, Ontario, Otsego, Saratoga, Schoharie, Tompkins, Westchester, and Yates do not have any OTB parlors.

Each of the OTB corporations accepts wagers at a number of full-service branch locations, at self-service terminals located in restaurants and bars, and on the internet. Capital OTB still accept bets over the phone.

Out of each wager placed through OTB, approximately 77 percent goes into the parimutuel pools for distribution to winning bettors. The remaining amount, known as the "takeout", is retained by the OTB operator. In addition, a surcharge of 5 or 6 percent is deducted from most payouts to winning OTB bettors. From these revenues, payments are made to the state, participating counties and cities, racetracks, and funds to support the racing industry. After the OTB's operating expenses are paid, any remaining profits are disbursed to the state and the participating counties and cities.

=== Capital OTB ===
Capital OTB grew out of Schenectady's OTB operations and was formed in 1975.

Capital District Regional Off-Track Betting Corporation covers sixteen counties including the cities of Albany and Schenectady. It has 13 branch locations, including its flagship Clubhouse Race Book in Albany.

=== Nassau OTB ===
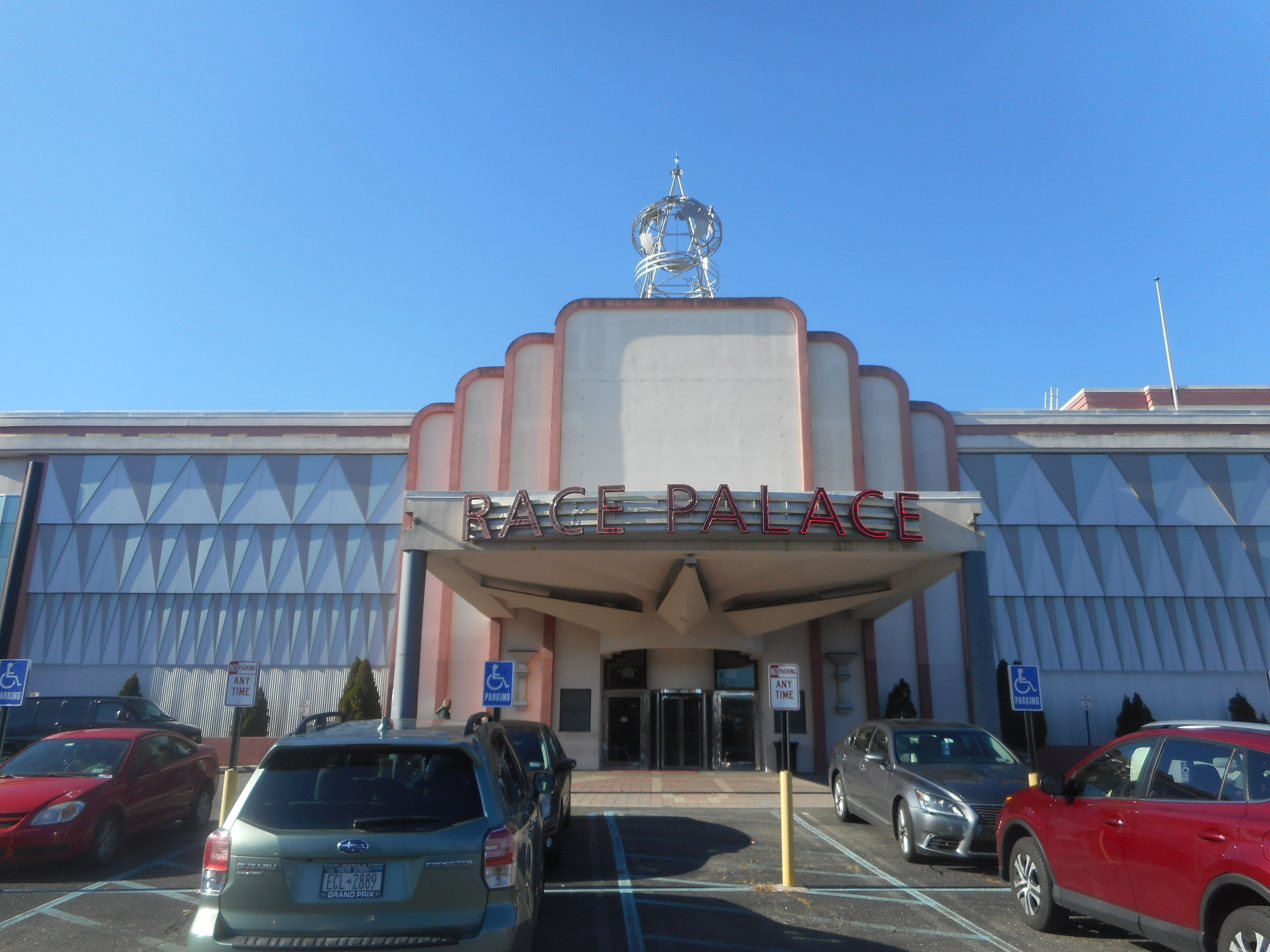
Race Palace in Plainview run by Nassau OTB, the former site of the Galaxie Hotel.

Nassau Regional Off-Track Betting Corporation, also known as Nassau Downs, covers Nassau County, and first started taking bets in 1975. It has four branch locations, including Race Palace, its flagship teletheater in Plainview. A 2013 law authorizes the corporation to run a casino with up to 1,000 slot machines; instead of opening a casino in Nassau County, that right was licensed to Aqueduct Racetrack to enable an expansion of its Resorts World casino.

=== Suffolk OTB ===
Suffolk Regional Off-Track Betting Corporation covers Suffolk County. It owns and operates Jake's 58 Hotel & Casino in Islandia, under a law authorizing Suffolk OTB to run a casino with up to 1,000 slot machines. It also operates two branch locations, including its flagship Racing Forum teletheater in Hauppauge.

The corporation was under Chapter 9 bankruptcy protection from 2012 to 2020. Jake's 58 was opened in 2017 by Delaware North under license from Suffolk OTB; it was purchased by the OTB corporation in 2021 for $120 million.

=== Western OTB ===
Western Regional Off-Track Betting Corporation covers fifteen counties in Western New York and the cities of Buffalo and Rochester. It has eight branch offices, and also owns and operates Batavia Downs racetrack and casino.

== Defunct OTB corporations ==
=== Catskill (1976–2024) ===
Catskill Regional Off-Track Betting Corporation covered ten counties in the Catskills and Southern Tier regions. Stand-alone OTB locations closed during the COVID-19 pandemic in 2020 and never reopened.

In 2022, Gov. Kathy Hochul released a long-buried report from the Andrew Cuomo administration, accusing Catskill OTB of waste, mismanagement and hoarding broken equipment. That year, the New York State legislature considered merging Catskill OTB with the more profitable Capital OTB however it was given a lifeline in the state budget for 2023–2024. That year, in 2023, it had 13 locations at various bars, pubs and restaurants.

Catskill OTB officially ceased taking bets and closed its operations on November 30, 2024, though it hoped new legislation and financial assistance could be secured to restructure and reopen at some point in the future. Bettor accounts were transferred to Suffolk OTB. In response, the Director of the New York State Gaming Commission blamed the closure on a "pattern of mismanagement that has plagued this organization for years."

=== New York City (1971–2010) ===
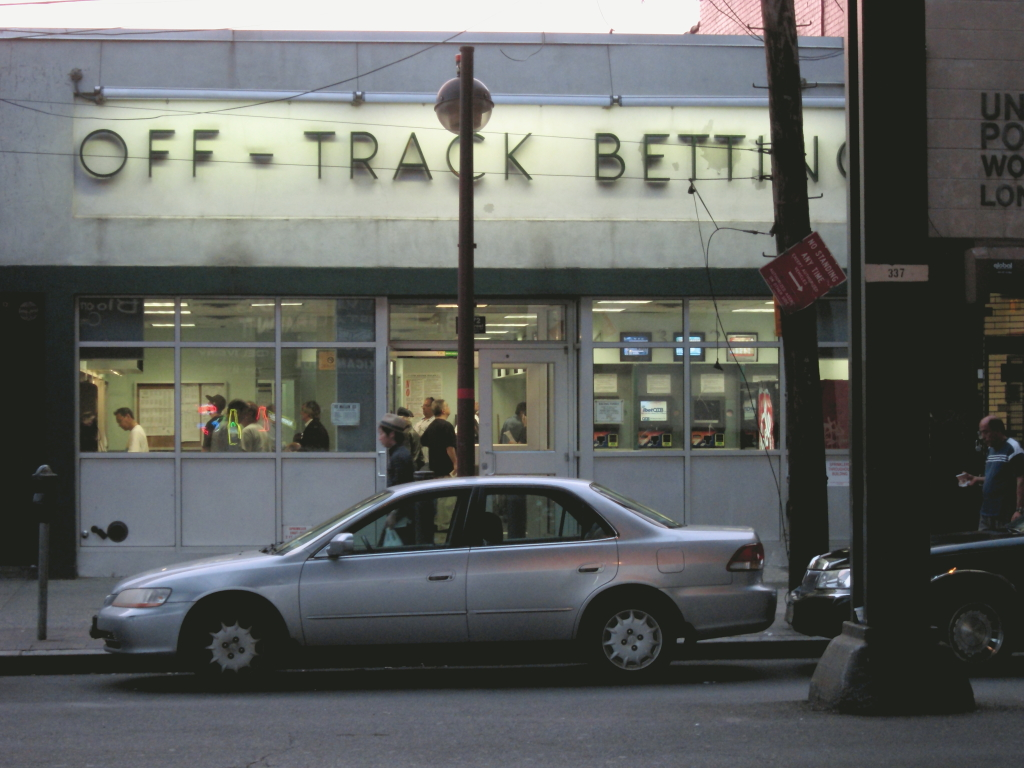
An OTB parlor in Ditmars, Queens, as seen in June 2010

The New York City Off-Track Betting Corporation covered the five boroughs of New York City. At its peak in the mid-1980s, it had over 150 betting parlors. Mayor Rudy Giuliani attempted to privatize the corporation, and in 2001 the bid was won by Magna Entertainment and Greenwood Racing over a partnership between NYRA and Churchill Downs Incorporated. However, the state legislature never approved the deal, and his successor Michael Bloomberg cancelled the process.

In June 2008, NYC OTB was taken over by New York State. The corporation filed for Chapter 9 bankruptcy protection in 2009, by which time it had only 66 parlors. On December 7, 2010, the New York City OTB permanently closed all of its parlors as part of its liquidation.

== See also ==
- New York Racing Association
