= Joe Moreino =

American football player (born 1955)

No. 71
- Position: Defensive tackle

Personal information
- Born: April 4, 1955 (age 71); Providence, Rhode Island, U.S.
- Listed height: 6 ft 6 in (1.98 m)
- Listed weight: 246 lb (112 kg)

Career information
- High school: Central Islip
- College: Idaho State (1973–1977)
- NFL draft: 1978: undrafted

Career history
- Dallas Cowboys (1978)*; New York Jets (1978–1979); Saskatchewan Roughriders (1979); Tampa Bay Buccaneers (1980)*
- * Offseason or practice squad member only
- Stats at Pro Football Reference

Joseph P. Moreino (born April 4, 1955) is an American former professional football player who was a defensive tackle for the New York Jets of National Football League (NFL). He played college football for the Idaho State Bengals.

Born in Providence, Rhode Island, Moreino attended Central Islip High School in New York and then Idaho State University. He played college football for the Bengals from 1973 to 1977. He was a two-way lineman for the Bengals, where he was a "bruising 245-pounder" and a top blocker. Initially a guard, he moved to tackle as a senior and was named honorary team captain.

After signing and then being released by the Dallas Cowboys in the 1978 NFL offseason, Moreino was signed by the New York Jets to play defensive tackle on October 31, 1978. He was active for one game during the 1978 season, debuting in a 37–34 loss to the Cleveland Browns in Week 15. He was released by the Jets in 1979 and joined the Saskatchewan Roughriders of the Canadian Football League (CFL), appearing in six CFL games that season.

Moreino signed with the Tampa Bay Buccaneers in July 1980 but was later placed on injured reserve and did not appear in any games. After his football career, he returned to Rhode Island and became a firefighter. He was inducted into the Idaho State Sports Hall of Fame in 2018.
