= Islandia, New York =

- Village
- Incorporated Village of Islandia
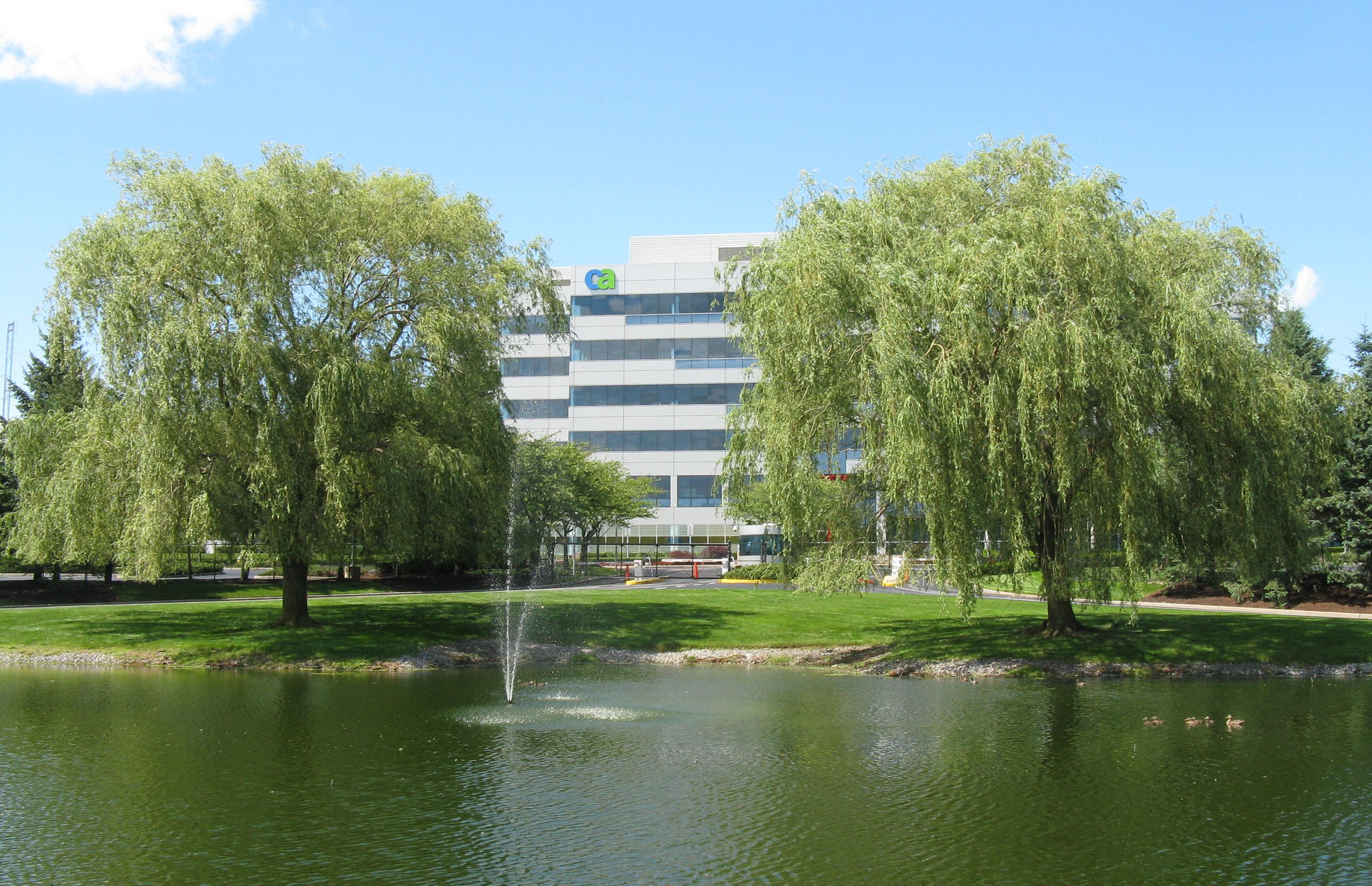
- The former headquarters of CA Technologies, located in Islandia, as seen in 2009

- Official seal and letterhead

- Location within Suffolk County

- Location on Long Island Location within the state of New York
- Coordinates: 40°48′17″N 73°10′22″W
- Country: United States
- State: New York
- County: Suffolk
- Town: Islip
- Incorporated: April 1985
- Founded by: Warren Raymond

Government
  - Mayor: Allan M. Dorman
  - Deputy Mayor: Thomas Annicaro

Area
  - Total: 2.21 sq mi (5.73 km^{2})
  - Land: 2.21 sq mi (5.73 km^{2})
  - Water: 0 sq mi (0.00 km^{2})
- Elevation: 66 ft (20 m)

Population (2020)
  - Total: 3,567
  - Density: 1,611.2/sq mi (622.08/km^{2})
- Time zone: UTC-5 (Eastern (EST))
  - Summer (DST): UTC-4 (EDT)
- ZIP codes: 11749, 11760
- Area codes: 631, 934
- FIPS code: 36-37840
- GNIS feature ID: 0979937
- Website: www.newvillageofislandia.com

Islandia is a village in the northern part of the Town of Islip in Suffolk County, on Long Island, in New York, United States. The population was 3,567 at the time of the 2020 census.

== History ==
Islandia incorporated itself as a village in April 1985 after CA Technologies established its world headquarters in Hauppauge and trying to capture the Hauppauge School District, in the area some people informally referred to as South Hauppauge. After more than three years of conducting local research, residents appeared in front of Islip's officials to take the first steps in incorporating Islandia on September 16, 1980. At the meeting, locals presented the Town of Islip was a petition signed by 432 Islandia Residents, which was over the 180 minimum required, and also presented the $1,000 (1980 USD) filing fee required. Many officials in the Town of Islip, including Town Supervisor Michael LoGrande, were less than thrilled with the proposal, and Islip soon sued the organizers of the prospective village in an attempt to prevent Islandia's incorporation. It wasn't until December 1984 that the Town of Islip dropped their opposition and asked residents in return for at least 200 residents to sign a letter to promise that the community would not exclude minorities from living within its borders. An incorporation vote was soon held, during which residents ultimately voted in favor of incorporating, and in April 1985, Islandia officially became an incorporated village. Its founding father was Warren Raymond.

When it incorporated, Islandia became the first new village on Long Island to incorporate in over 15 years (the last village incorporated prior to Islandia was Lake Grove in 1968).

The core of Islandia is a 500-home housing development built by Levitt & Sons in or about 1963, which offered seven different model homes to choose from. The original Levitt home buyers were informed during pre-construction sales that their children should attend the Hauppauge Union Free School District, but instead it became part of the Central Islip Union Free School District. The Levitt development was assigned the Central Islip ZIP code 11722 and was considered part of Central Islip until the incorporation of Islandia in 1985.

In August 2016, the village board approved plans for a new casino to be opened at the Long Island Marriott hotel. These plans attracted opposition from some members of the community citing possible crime and traffic problems, while others supported the first new casino to be opened in Suffolk County. Marriott International sold the property to Delaware North for $40.41 million because Marriott has a corporate policy against gambling. On February 27, 2017, Jake's 58 Hotel & Casino opened with 250 video lottery terminals.

In January 2024, the former CA Technologies headquarters, which had become vacant after the company moved its nerve center to New York City, was imploded via controlled explosion after being purchased in 2021, with its new owners opting to redevelop the property. The redevelopment plans call for the construction of up to 8 industrial and light-manufacturing buildings.

== Geography ==
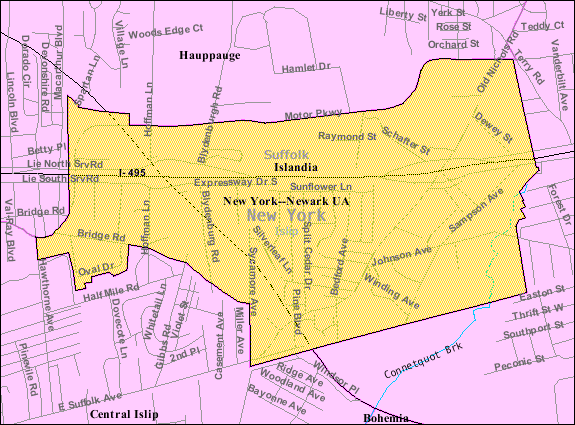
U.S. census map of Islandia

According to the United States Census Bureau, the village has a total area of 2.2 square miles (5.7 km^{2}), all land.

Honeysuckle Pond and portions of the Connetquot River – both located within the Suffolk County-operated Lakeland Park – lie within the confines of the village and are thus included in its geographic makeup. In the latter half of 2016 and the majority of 2017, the pond was virtually nonexistent, reduced to a muddy puddle devoid of wildlife.

The Long Island Expressway (I-495) passes through the northern half of the village, and it is near the geographic center of Long Island. It has no central business district.

== Demographics ==
Historical population
| Census | Pop. | Note | %± |
|---|---|---|---|
| 1990 | 2,769 | | — |
| 2000 | 3,057 | | 10.4% |
| 2010 | 3,335 | | 9.1% |
| 2020 | 3,567 | | 7.0% |
U.S. Decennial Census

=== 2020 census ===
As of the 2020 census, Islandia had a population of 3,567. The median age was 47.7 years. 16.4% of residents were under the age of 18 and 25.8% of residents were 65 years of age or older. For every 100 females there were 83.0 males, and for every 100 females age 18 and over there were 80.9 males age 18 and over.

100.0% of residents lived in urban areas, while 0.0% lived in rural areas.

There were 1,044 households in Islandia, of which 34.9% had children under the age of 18 living in them. Of all households, 47.0% were married-couple households, 16.6% were households with a male householder and no spouse or partner present, and 29.4% were households with a female householder and no spouse or partner present. About 22.6% of all households were made up of individuals and 9.7% had someone living alone who was 65 years of age or older.

There were 1,087 housing units, of which 4.0% were vacant. The homeowner vacancy rate was 1.9% and the rental vacancy rate was 1.6%.

Racial composition as of the 2020 census
| Race | Number | Percent |
|---|---|---|
| White | 1,862 | 52.2% |
| Black or African American | 478 | 13.4% |
| American Indian and Alaska Native | 46 | 1.3% |
| Asian | 219 | 6.1% |
| Native Hawaiian and Other Pacific Islander | 0 | 0.0% |
| Some other race | 518 | 14.5% |
| Two or more races | 444 | 12.4% |
| Hispanic or Latino (of any race) | 1,135 | 31.8% |

=== 2000 census ===
As of the 2000 census, there were 3,057 people, 1,007 households, and 753 families residing in the village. The population density was 1,369.6 inhabitants per square mile (528.8/km^{2}). There were 1,031 housing units at an average density of 461.9 per square mile (178.3/km^{2}). The racial makeup of the village was 73.63% White, 12.30% African American, 0.13% Native American, 6.05% Asian, 0.03% Pacific Islander, 4.94% from other races, and 2.91% from two or more races. Hispanic or Latino of any race were 19.10% of the population.

There were 1,007 households, out of which 35.3% had children under the age of 18 living with them, 59.8% were married couples living together, 11.1% had a female householder with no husband present, and 25.2% were non-families. 18.8% of all households were made up of individuals, and 2.3% had someone living alone who was 65 years of age or older. The average household size was 3.04 and the average family size was 3.49.

In the village, the population was spread out, with 24.7% under the age of 18, 6.9% from 18 to 24, 36.3% from 25 to 44, 25.1% from 45 to 64, and 7.0% who were 65 years of age or older. The median age was 36 years. For every 100 females, there were 92.3 males. For every 100 females age 18 and over, there were 88.8 males.

The median income for a household in the village was $69,519, and the median income for a family was $69,615. Males had a median income of $46,083 versus $34,261 for females. The per capita income for the village was $25,682. About 4.0% of families and 5.5% of the population were below the poverty line, including 7.1% of those under age 18 and 11.3% of those age 65 or over.

As of 2000, Islandia had the highest percentage of Turkish residents in the United States, at 2.5% of the village's population.

== Government ==
The Village of Islandia is governed by the Islandia Village Board of Trustees, which consists of a mayor, a deputy mayor, and three trustees. All five board members are elected to four-year terms, with the village elections being held biennially on odd-numbered years.

As of April 2025, the Mayor of Islandia is Allan M. Dorman, the Deputy Mayor is Thomas Annicaro, and the Village Trustees are Raymond Bush, Patricia Peters, and Victor Montanez.

=== Politics ===
In the 2024 U.S. presidential election, the majority of Islandia voters voted for Kamala D. Harris (D).

== Education ==
The majority of Islandia is located within the boundaries of – and is thus served by – the Central Islip Union Free School District. Smaller portions are located within – and served by – the Connetquot Central School District and the Hauppauge Union Free School District. Accordingly, children residing within Islandia who attend public schools attend school in one of these three districts, depending on where they reside within the village.

== Infrastructure ==
=== Transportation ===
==== Road ====
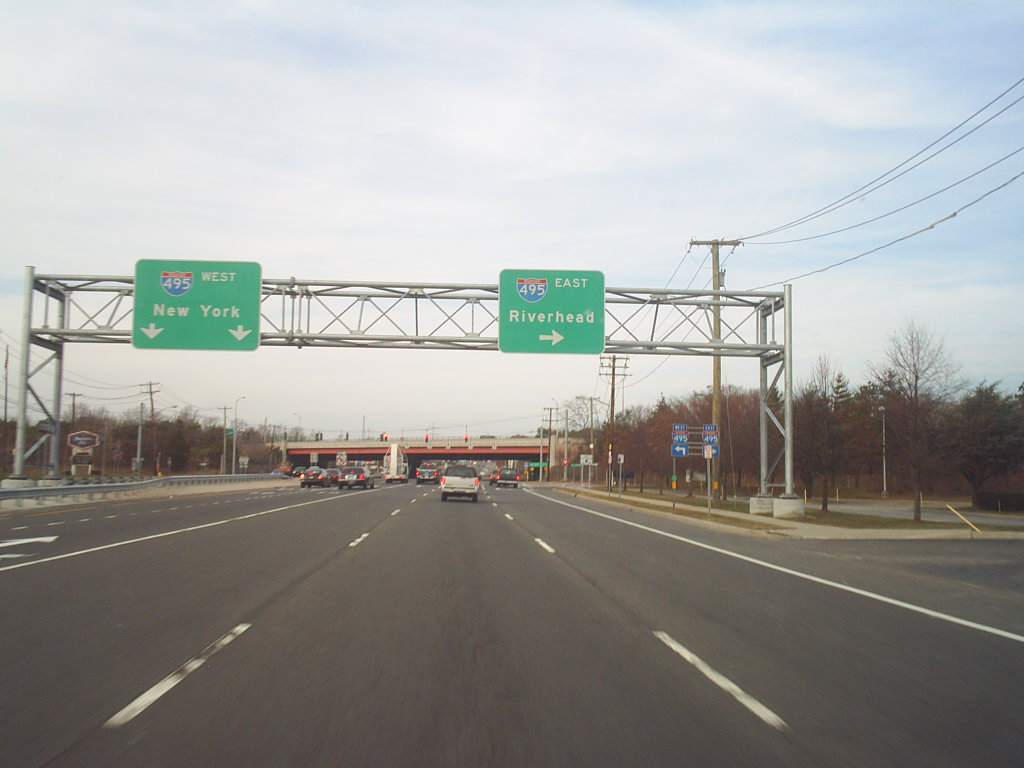
Veterans Memorial Highway (NY 454) approaching the Long Island Expressway (I-495) within Islandia in 2005

Two state-maintained highways pass through and Islandia:

- Long Island Expressway (I-495)
- Veterans Memorial Highway (NY 454)

Other major roads within the village include Johnson Avenue, the Long Island Motor Parkway (CR 67), Old Nichols Road, and Suffolk Avenue (CR 100).

==== Rail ====
Although there are no railroad stations located within Islandia, the Long Island Rail Road's Ronkonkoma Branch forms the majority of the village's southern border.

==== Bus ====
Islandia is served by Suffolk County Transit bus routes 4, 6, 17, 52A, 52B, and S110.

=== Utilities ===
==== Natural gas ====
National Grid USA provides natural gas to homes and businesses that are hooked up to natural gas lines in Islandia.

==== Power ====
PSEG Long Island provides power to all homes and businesses within Islandia.

==== Sewage ====
Islandia is primarily not connected to any sanitary sewers. Accordingly, the overwhelming majority of the village – spare for some commercial properties – relies on cesspools and septic systems.

==== Water ====
The water supply system in Islandia is operated by the Suffolk County Water Authority.

== See also ==
- List of villages in New York (state)
- CA Technologies
