= Randy Beverly =

American football player (born 1944)

No. 42, 27
- Position: Defensive back

Personal information
- Born: April 3, 1944 (age 82); Wildwood, New Jersey, U.S.
- Listed height: 5 ft 11 in (1.80 m)
- Listed weight: 190 lb (86 kg)

Career information
- High school: Wildwood
- College: Colorado State
- NFL draft: 1967: undrafted

Career history
- New York Jets (1967–1969); Boston Patriots (1970–1971); New York Stars (1974)

Awards and highlights
- Super Bowl champion (III); AFL champion (1968)

Career NFL/AFL statistics
- Interceptions: 12
- Fumble recoveries: 2
- Touchdowns: 1
- Stats at Pro Football Reference

Randy Beverly (born April 3, 1944) is an American former professional football player who was a cornerback in the American Football League (AFL) and National Football League (NFL). He played college football for the Colorado State Rams. Beverly started playing in the AFL for the New York Jets. He had two interceptions in their win in Super Bowl III in 1969.

== Early career ==
Beverly grew up in Wildwood in southern New Jersey. He attended Wildwood High School, where he won the state long jump championship. He attended junior college in Trinidad, Colorado, where he was a junior college All-American. He later attended Colorado State University in Fort Collins, Colorado, where he played football. At Colorado State, he returned a kick-off for 99 yards.

Considered too small to play professional football, Beverly was passed up in the 1967 NFL/AFL draft. He signed with the Jets as rookie free agent in the fall of 1967. He received a signing bonus of $500 and a one-year contract of $12,500. In 1968, Beverly became the starting cornerback of the Jets. The team went 11–3, winning the American Football League East division. They defeated the Oakland Raiders in the AFL Championship game and faced the Baltimore Colts of the National Football League in Super Bowl III.

== Super Bowl III ==
The Jets had managed a solid defense throughout the season, but going into Super Bowl III, the Jets passing defense was not considered particularly strong. With the Jets installed as an 18-point underdog, Beverly's small stature made him a main target of Colts' quarterback Earl Morrall. However, Beverly put together a remarkable performance, becoming the first player ever to record two interceptions in a Super Bowl.

In the first quarter, the Colts drove down the field, seemingly fulfilling the predictions about their offensive prowess. Reaching the Jets' 10-yard-line, Morrall threw a pass into the end zone, but the pass bounced off a Jets lineman, then hit the shoulder pads of Colts tight end Tom Mitchell. Beverly tracked the ball and caught it in the end zone, ending the Colts first drive.

The Jets defense continued to stymie the Colts for the rest of the first half, shutting them out and prompting the insertion of Colt legend Johnny Unitas at quarterback. Driving the Colts down the field and poised to score the team's first touchdown of the game, Unitas threw a crossing pattern to one of his wide receiver's in the end zone, but Beverly stepped in front and caught the ball in the end zone, downing it for a touchback. While the Colts managed to score a late touchdown, the Jets' 16–7 triumph is considered to be one of the greatest upsets in the history of professional sports in the United States.

== Later career ==
Beverly played a third season with the Jets in 1969. In 1970 the Jets traded Beverly to the San Diego Chargers for wide receiver Richard Trapp. He was waived by the Chargers and later signed by the Boston Patriots, where he played on special teams. Although his two interceptions were among the most dramatic in the history of postseason NFL play, he intercepted only four passes during the rest of his NFL career. He later played in the World Football League with former Jet Super Bowl alumni Gerry Philbin, George Sauer Jr., John Dockery, and Vito (Babe) Parilli with the New York Stars.

Beverly now lives in Monroe Township in Middlesex County, New Jersey. He regularly attends home games of the New York Jets at Giants Stadium with other Jets alumni. He is a husband, father, grandfather of eight and great-grandfather of one. Grand children's names are from oldest to youngest; Sean, Vanessa, Briana, Victoria, Brittany, Stefania, Fabio Randy, Isaiah Pierce and Tove. Great-grandson's name is Nicolas. One of his sons, Randy Beverly Jr., was the head coach of an American football team in Sweden, Örebro Black Knights. He was earlier the head coach of the Milano Rams.

== See also ==
- List of American Football League players
