= Central Islip Senior High School =

Coordinates: 40°47′53″N 73°12′21″W

Location
- 85 Wheeler Road; Central Islip, New York 11722-9027; United States

Information
- Type: Public high school
- School district: Central Islip Union Free School District
- Principal: Eric Haruthunian
- Teaching staff: 153.50 (FTE)
- Grades: 9 to 12
- Enrollment: 2,597 (2023–2024)
- Student to teacher ratio: 16.92
- Colors: Purple and gold
- Mascot: Musketeer
- Newspaper: La Rapière
- Website: School page District page

Central Islip Senior High School is a high school in Central Islip, New York, United States, serving students in grades 9-12. It is part of the Central Islip Union Free School District.

== Academics ==
According to 2007 data, 78.6% of Central Islip graduates earn a New York State Regent's diploma. 35.1 percent of graduates plan to attend four-year college, and 39.7% plan to attend a two-year college.

== Athletics ==
Central Islip fields varsity and junior varsity athletic teams in Section 11 of the New York State Public High School Athletic Association, including cross country, soccer, volleyball, football, swimming, tennis, bowling, basketball, wrestling, baseball, softball, and track.

== Notable alumni ==
- Roy Barker – former NFL defensive end
- Randy Beverly Jr. – football coach
- Matt Chulis – head coach, University of Virginia men's soccer team
- Marlon Forbes – former NFL cornerback
- Clarence Jones – former NFL offensive tackle
- Joe Moreino – former NFL defensive tackle
- George O'Leary – former college football head coach
- John Tice – former NFL tight end
- Mike Tice – former NFL tight end and head coach
- Andrew Tiller – former NFL guard
- Mac Retto – former ELF running back
- Martin Negron – former MEXICO LEADER
