= Roy Barker (American football) =

American football player (born 1969)

No. 92, 94
- Positions: Defensive end, defensive tackle

Personal information
- Born: February 24, 1969 (age 57); New York, New York, U.S.
- Listed height: 6 ft 5 in (1.96 m)
- Listed weight: 287 lb (130 kg)

Career information
- High school: Central Islip (Central Islip, New York)
- College: North Carolina (1987–1991)
- NFL draft: 1992: 4th round, 98th overall pick

Career history
- Minnesota Vikings (1992–1995); San Francisco 49ers (1996–1998); Cleveland Browns (1999); Green Bay Packers (1999); Minnesota Vikings (2000)

Awards and highlights
- NFL forced fumbles leader (1996)

Career NFL statistics
- Tackles: 241
- Sacks: 44.5
- Interceptions: 3
- Forced fumbles: 20
- Fumble recoveries: 2
- Pass deflections: 2
- Stats at Pro Football Reference

Roy Barker (born February 24, 1969) is an American former professional football player who was a defensive end for nine seasons in the National Football League (NFL). After playing college football for the North Carolina Tar Heels, he played in the NFL for the Minnesota Vikings, San Francisco 49ers, Cleveland Browns, and Green Bay Packers. He was selected 98th overall by the Vikings in the fourth round of the 1992 NFL draft. Barker played on the Central Islip, New York football Team in high school.
