= Central Islip Public Schools =

School district in the U.S. state of New York

Central Islip Union Free School District

Location
- Central Islip, Suffolk County, New York; United States

District information
- Grades: K-12
- President: Luis Alcantara
- Superintendent: Dr. Sharon A. Dungee
- Schools: 8

Students and staff
- Students: 7,569
- District mascot: Musketeers
- Colors: Purple, Gold, and Black

Other information
- Graduation Rate: 77%
- District Offices: Central Islip High School 50 Wheeler Road Central Islip, NY 11722
- Newspaper: La Rapière
- Website: www.centralislip.k12.ny.us

The Central Islip Union Free School District, also known as the Central Islip Public Schools, is a school district on Long Island, New York. The district is in the Town of Islip and serves students in Central Islip and parts of Islandia and Ronkonkoma.

== History ==
In 1997 the voters approved the districts revised budget proposal, which called for installing five computers in each classroom and updating the technology in the schools to contemporary standards.

In 2007, the school district had 6,100 students.

== Schools ==
- Central Islip Senior High School (grades 9-12, Central Islip)
- Ralph G. Reed Middle School (grades 7-8, Central Islip)

Elementary schools (grades K-6):

- Cordello Avenue Elementary School (Central Islip)
- Andrew T. Morrow Elementary School (Islandia)
- Marguerite Mulvey Elementary School (Central Islip)
- Francis J. O'Neill Elementary School (Central Islip)
- Anthony Alfano Elementary School (Central Islip) (also houses pre-kindergarten)
- Charles A. Mulligan Elementary School (Central Islip)
