= Batavia Downs =

Horseracing venue in Batavia, New York

- Interactive map of Batavia Downs
- Location: Batavia, New York
- Coordinates: 43°0′34.92″N 78°12′18.22″W
- Owned by: Western OTB
- Date opened: September 20, 2018
- Race type: Harness Racing

Batavia Downs is a harness racing track and casino in Batavia, New York. It is located in Genesee County between Buffalo and Rochester just off of the New York State Thruway (Interstate 90). It opened on September 20, 1940, and is the oldest lighted harness racetrack in the United States. The track is exactly .5 miles (0.80 km) long.

== History ==
In 1939, William "Lefty" Goldberg and others chose Batavia, halfway between Buffalo and Rochester, for par-mutuel wagering on horse races. Harold Wishman, William Zimmer, Arthur Martin and Frederick Strohm were stockholders in the Monroe-Genesee Breeders Association, a predecessor to the Genesee-Monroe Racing Association, which rented the Genesee County Fairgrounds for racing.

=== 1940s ===
In 1940, Batavia Downs opened pari-mutuel racing at 8:20 PM on September 20, 1940. Crowds of more than 2,500 attended and $10,411 was wagered on the first card.

In 1941, Batavia Downs opened to an estimated crowd of about 4,000 and a handle of $20,231. Track lighting was improved.

The season was cancelled in 1942 and 1943 because of war travel restrictions.

In 1944, Pat E. Provenzano borrowed money and bought out stockholder William Weisman, a New York City attorney, for $15,000. Provenzano was elected president of the Genesee Monroe Racing Association.

In 1947, Provenzano purchased the racetrack property for $150,000 after the Genesee County Agricultural Society's fair association went bankrupt. Proximity set the then-track record of 2:04. In 1948 she broke her own time record with a time of 1:59 3/5.

=== 1950s ===
In 1959, Bye Bye Byrd beat Tar Boy and equaled the world record for a half-mile track, 1:59.2, 9,633 people were in attendance.

=== 1960s ===
In 1962, a fire devastated the stables, killing a caretaker, 26 horses, and causing an estimated $625,000 in damages, not including lost revenues. The Downs underwent extensive renovations to prevent fires.

In 1963, Batavia Downs welcomed its eight millionth visitor.

In 1964, the grandstand was enclosed in glass.

In 1966, Bret Hanover down under Cardigan Bay set a track record of 1:58.1. Batavia Downs enjoyed its biggest crowd at the time, as 15,228 came to watch and wagered $515,334.

In 1968, Downs General Manager Herm Grannis was elected president of Harness Tracks of America, where he established the Harness Tracks Security.

=== 1970s ===
In 1970, Batavia Downs was honored by the Genesee County Chamber of Commerce for spreading the name and fame of Batavia all over the United States.

In 1972, New York State legislation created off-track betting to bail New York City out of near bankruptcy.

In 1973, the Western Regional Off-Track Betting Corporation was formed.

Batavia Downs and Buffalo Raceway changed operations in 1975 to a single season from the split-season racing.

Pat Provenzano, longtime president of the Downs, and John O. Marra, Executive Vice-president, were indicted for alleged tax evasion charges in 1976. Provenzano pleads no contest and was fined $10,000. Provenzano died the next year on September 9 at age 76.

In 1977, Double-Gaited Excalibur, owned by Batavia driver, Fred Haslip and driven by Elba farmer Paul Zambito Jr. set a world record. He both trotted and paced a time of 2:03 3/5 miles for a total of 4:07 1/5, breaking a world record set in 1939.

=== 1980s ===
In 1980, Niatross set a track record of 1:55 before a crowd of 9,915. Later that year, Niatross set an all-age world record for pacers on a half-mile track. That year, he lost only two of his 26 starts.

Barbara H. Provenzano, Pat's widow, bought out other non-family stockholders in 1981. She served as chairwoman of the board until her death in 1990. The Pat E. Provenzano Memorial Trot was inaugurated in 1984.

The Genesee County Chamber of Commerce honored Batavia Downs in 1987 for making a major impact on the region's economy.

In 1988, Ambro Flori won the only Breeders' Crown ever held at Batavia Downs. The purse was $286,756 (largest purse at Batavia Downs).

=== 1990s ===
In 1993, Earl won the Provenzano Trot and broke the all-aged trotting record in 1:56. Later that year, Getting Personal won the New York Sire Stake event and broke the track record 1:53.3.

In 1994, Batavia Downs became the first track in New York history to have its license revoked by racing authorities. This was due to a contract dispute with horseman.

In 1997, the track held a shorter meet, only 28 days. Live racing ended.

In 1998, Western OTB bought the track for $2.48 million. The next year, Western OTB and Buffalo Raceway officials agreed that the Erie County track would support Western's bid to obtain a racing license, in exchange for Western paying an annual sum for five years.

=== 2000s ===
In 2000, opposition from other racetracks in the state and a leadership battle in the State Assembly prevented legislation from being passed to allow Off-Track Betting Corporation (OTB) to run a track.

In 2001, simulcasting opened under direction of OTB. That same year, a bill passed allowing Western OTB to apply for a harness racing license.

Batavia Downs reopened on July 29, 2002, under the direction of Western OTB with over $10 million in renovations. It welcomed over 6,000 in attendance. Later that year the first ever Robert J. Kane Memorial pace was held and won by Mattarocket.

Batavia Downs hired the youngest Racing Secretary in the country when they hired local Elba man Joe Zambito who was only 29 years old at the time. Mr. Zambito was also hired as the assistant announcer to former Meadowlands announcer/weatherman John Bothe. Mr. Bothe continued to be the announcer until the 2007 season when Mr. Zambito took over.

In August 2007, the first-ever visit of the Mildred Williams Lady Driving Series at Batavia Downs was held, with more than $10,000 being raised for breast cancer research.

The largest attendance at the track in the 2007 season was for a memorial race, which commemorated the great Albatross's visit to the track. The race was remembered as the “Dream Pace”, in 1972 and was a showdown of the world's greatest pacers at Batavia Downs.

S J's Morgan win 11 races at the meet and is named 2008 Horse of the Year.

After 2008's meet, Ron Beback Jr. takes home first ever Downs trainer and driver title.

In 2008, Jeff Gregory wins $10,000 All-Star Drivers Challenge Fundraiser, which raised over $15,000 raised for the Breast Cancer Coalition of Rochester.

In 2009, Russell Hill sets new track record for 3 year-old colt and gelding trotters winning in 1:57.4.

OK Braveheart establishes new track record for 3 year-old pacing colts and geldings winning in 1:52.2, the fastest mile of the season.

Favorite Foiled Again cruises in 1:52.3 taking the tracks biggest local event, the $40,000 Robert J. Kane Memorial Pace.

Kevin Cummings wins first ever Batavia Downs Casino drivers title. Sherri Holliday wins her first training title at the Downs.

6-year-old pacer Arm and a Leg is named 2009 Horse of the Year at Batavia Downs Casino.

Over $15,000 is raised for Mercy Flight of WNY through first ever Batavia Downs Casino golf tournament, sponsorship of races, silent auction.

2010s

Reinsman Jeff Gregory, John Schroeder and Clint Galbraith become the inaugural members of the Upstate Harness Writers, Batavia Downs Hall of Fame.

Kaley Falkowski of Batavia High wins the first ever College Scholarship race that featured five area high school students competing for $7,500 in scholarship money.

In 2013, Foiled Again, the richest harness horse in the History of Harness Racing returned to the Batavia oval to win the Robert J. Kane Memorial Pace in front of a packed house.

In 2016, the Hotel at Batavia Downs opened, featuring 84 guest rooms, including suites with private balconies overlooking the racetrack and standard rooms with track views. The addition expanded Batavia Downs' hospitality offerings, providing guests with on-site accommodations, complimentary breakfast, and special hotel packages throughout each year. Guests frequently enjoy watching the horses warm up & race right from their window.

In 2017, Batavia Downs launched its outdoor summer concert series, known as "Rockin' The Downs." The inaugural six-show lineup featured nationally recognized performers including Lonestar, Dennis DeYoung of Styx, Eddie Money, Lou Gramm, the Marshall Tucker Band and Lee Greenwood. The concerts brought major touring acts to the racetrack and established a new summer entertainment tradition in the region, attracting thousands per show.

In 2019, the series had expanded to eight shows and continued to feature nationally known artists, including Survivor, Queensryche, Gin Blossoms, Theory of a Deadman, and many more.

2020s

Following the COVID-19 pandemic, the Rockin' The Downs Summer Concert Series returned in 2021, with COVID-related safety measures.

In 2023, Batavia Downs brought back winter racing for the first time in 20 years, launching a 14-day winter meet in January. The return of winter racing provided additional opportunities for horsemen and extended live racing action into the winter months, establishing a new tradition at the historic oval.

In November 2024, Byron Brown, former Mayor of Buffalo, was appointed President & CEO of Western Regional Off-Track Betting Corporation, ushering in a new chapter of leadership for the organization that operates Batavia Downs Gaming & Hotel. Bringing decades of public service and regional leadership experience, Brown took the helm with a focus on strengthening operations, expanding the organizations reach, and continuing to generate meaningful economic benefits for its 17 member municipalities.

In 2025, Batavia Downs celebrated its 85th anniversary, marking 85 years since its first para-mutuel harness race on Sept. 20, 1940. The facility invested nearly $300,000 in improvements, including a complete resurfacing of the half-mile racetrack. Batavia Downs also hosted the prestigious $2.4 million New York Sire Stakes Night of Champions for the second time in its history. The eighth annual Rockin' The Downs concert series welcomed more than 25,000 attendees, featuring acts including Little River Band, The Commodores, Kansas, and Lou Gramm. The series generated record profits.

In 2026, Batavia Downs announced plans for a significant future expansion, including at least 70 additional hotel rooms, a new special events center, and expanded parking, reflecting the continued growth of the property as a regional entertainment and hospitality destination.

In May 2026, Crystal Rodriguez-Dabney was elected Chair of the Western Regional Off-Track Betting Corporation Board of Directors, making history as the first woman to hold the position in the organizations history. Her appointment marked an important milestone for the organization as it continued into a new chapter focused on regional growth, strong leadership, and delivering lasting value to the 17 municipalities it serves.

== Racino (Casino & Racetrack) ==
In 2001, the New York State Legislature passed a bill to allow New York State racetracks to have video lottery terminals (VLTs) inside the racetracks, making them “racinos”.

Batavia's video lottery era began on May 18, 2005, with the opening of Batavia Downs Gaming. Over 5,000 people attended opening night. Today, the casino has over 950+ of the hottest machines made by Bally, IGT and Spielo. A list of current games can be found on the facilities website.

== Restaurants ==
Four restaurants are located on the premises.

The Clubhouse & Rail Bar is open on race nights during the live harness racing season July–December and features tiered style seating for view of the racetrack. A buffet-style and sit down menus are offered as is wagering via intertrack wagering windows. The clubhouse also features a bar.

Homestretch Grill is a fast-casual restaurant is open late and offers breakfast, lunch, and dinner. Patrons must be 18 or older to enter.

The Club Bud Light at 34 Rush sports bar, located on the gaming floor, is named after Buffalo Bills Hall-of-Fame running back Thurman Thomas & offers food and drink menus for both lunch and dinner daily. The restaurant features over 30 HDTVs, including two 15-foot screens, streaming sports action from around the globe. Must be 18 or older to enter the sports bar.

Fortune's Italian Steakhouse is located at the south end of the facility and features a fine-dining menu with a largely Italian and American menu.

Each restaurant has tables with track-views.

== Community Outreach & Giving Back ==
Since opening in 1940, Batavia Downs has maintained a strong connection to the Western New York community, serving as a gathering place for charitable fundraisers, community events, sponsorships, and initiatives that support local organizations and families. Over the years, Batavia Downs has partnered with numerous nonprofits, schools, veterans' organizations, first responders, and community groups to make a meaningful difference in the region.

Through its BDGCares initiatives, the organizations has supported causes ranging from cancer research and childhood cancer awareness to animal welfare, education, veterans services, and assistance to families in need. Fundraising events, charitable donations, employee volunteer efforts, and community partnerships have helped generate thousands of dollars for organizations making a difference locally and beyond.

Batavia Downs has established a longstanding tradition of supporting local veterans, including donating complimentary tickets to its Rockin' The Downs Summer Concert Series each year, giving veterans and their families the opportunity to enjoy nationally recognized entertainment. Additional initiatives include holiday food & toy drives, support for local police K-9 units, partnerships with the Roc Solid Foundation to build backyard playsets for children battling pediatric cancer, and fundraising events benefiting organizations such as Roswell Park Comprehensive Cancer Center, Make-A-Wish of Western New York, and the Breast Cancer Coalition of Rochester.

== Economic Impact & Regional Contributions ==
Batavia Downs is more than an entertainment destination; it is an important economic engine for Western New York, operated by Western Regional Off-Track Betting Corporation (WROTB), a public benefit corporation, serving 17 member municipalities, including 15 counties and the cities of Buffalo & Rochester, representing approx. 2.7 million residents.

Since its inception, WROTB has returned hundreds of millions of dollars to its participating municipalities through operating revenue and surcharge distributions. These funds help support local government budgets, public services, infrastructure, and programs throughout the region. In 2025 alone, distributions to member municipalities reached a record $12.9 million, a 92% increase over the previous year.

The organization is also a significant regional employer, providing more than 430 jobs across its operations. Many employees live in Genesee County and surrounding areas, making the organization an important source of local employment and household income.

In addition to the municipal distributions, Batavia Downs Gaming contributes to New York State's education funding through its video gaming operations. Since the program began in 2005, more than $517 million has been contributed to the state through the New York State Gaming Commission as of June 2025.
