= Jake's 58 Hotel & Casino =

Casino hotel

- Interactive map of Jake's 58 Hotel & Casino
- Location: Islandia, New York, United States; 40°48′38″N 73°9′58″W
- Opened: February 27, 2017
- No. of rooms: 200
- Casino type: Land-based
- Owner: Suffolk County Regional Off-Track Betting Corporation
- Operating license holder: Suffolk County Regional Off-Track Betting Corporation
- Website: https://jakes58.com/

Jake's 58 Hotel & Casino is a casino hotel located within the Incorporated Village of Islandia, in Suffolk County, New York, United States.

== History ==
Jake’s 58 opened in 2017, taking over the space which used to be a Marriott hotel. The purpose of opening the property was to help generate revenue for Suffolk County. The property is named after the nearby exit on the Long Island Expressway.

=== Expansion ===
The property is currently undergoing an expansion which will increase its gaming and convention space. A new parking garage to accommodate additional visitors is also being built.

== Features ==
The hotel features a total of 200 rooms. The casino is two stories tall and all games are automated. It features 1,000 video and electronic gaming machines, which includes slot machines, electronic table games, and off track betting.

== See also ==
- Off-track betting in New York
