= List of Pac-12 Conference national championships =

The following is a list of NCAA and AIAW championships won by Pac-12 Conference members. The Pac-12 was the first conference to win 500 team titles and currently (as of May 22, 2024) Pac-12 members have won 514 team NCAA national championships, putting them ahead of the second place Big Ten Conference. Since the 1999–2000 academic year, the Pac-12 claims a total of 223 NCAA team titles, including 3 by 1 school in 2022–2023. They have also led or tied the nation in NCAA Championships in 57 of the last 63 years, including the past 18 years, the only exceptions being in 1980–81, 1988–89, 1990–91 and 1995-96 when the conference finished second, and finished third in 1998-99 and 2004–2005.

This list also includes championships won by current Pac-12 schools while members of the Pacific Coast Conference (PCC), a closely related league that was formed in 1916 and disbanded in 1959. Although the current charter of what is now known as the Pac-12 dates only to the formation of the Athletic Association of Western Universities immediately after the demise of the PCC, the Pac-12 claims the PCC's history as its own. There is considerable continuity between the PCC and Pac-12—eight of the nine final members of the PCC (all except Idaho) became Pac-12 members; five of these schools had founded the AAWU, and all eight had joined the AAWU by the 1964–65 school year.

== Current members ==
| Institution | Location | Nickname | NCAA Team Championships (through June 3, 2024) | Team Championships as Pac-12 member |
|---|---|---|---|---|
| Oregon State University | Corvallis, Oregon | Beavers | 4 | 3 |
| Washington State University | Pullman, Washington | Cougars | 2 | 2 |
| Total | – | – | 6 | 5 |

=== Most recent NCAA championship ===
Legend for Most Recent National Title table by School
| Indicator | Meaning |
|---|---|
| * | Most recent NCAA championship |

| Team | Academic Year | Sport |
|---|---|---|
| Oregon State | 2017–18 | Baseball |
| Washington State | 1977–78 | Men's Indoor Track & Field |

== Fall Sports ==
=== Men's Sports ===
Cross Country (12)
| Year | School |
|---|---|
| 1971 | Oregon |
| 1973 | Oregon |
| 1974 | Oregon |
| 1977 | Oregon |
| 1996 | Stanford |
| 1997 | Stanford |
| 2002 | Stanford |
| 2003 | Stanford |
| 2007 | Oregon |
| 2008 | Oregon |
| 2013 | Colorado |
| 2014 | Colorado |

Soccer (7)
| Year | School |
|---|---|
| 1985 | UCLA |
| 1990 | UCLA |
| 1997 | UCLA |
| 2002 | UCLA |
| 2015 | Stanford |
| 2016 | Stanford |
| 2017 | Stanford |

Football †
| Year | School | Selector(s) |
| 1920 | California | CFRA, HAF, HS, NCF, SR |
| 1921 | California | BR, BS, CFRA, SR |
| 1922 | California | BR, HS, NCF, SR |
| 1923 | California | HS |
| 1926 | Stanford | DiS, HAF, NCF, SR |
| 1928 | USC | DiS, SR |
| 1929 | USC | HS, SR, B(QPRS) |
| 1931 | USC | BR, BS, CFRA, DiS, DuS, HAF, HS, NCF, PS, SR, WS, B(QPRS) |
| 1932 | USC | BR, BS, CFRA, DuS, HAF, HS, NCF, PS, SR, WS, B(QPRS) |
| 1933 | USC | WS |
| 1937 | California | DuS, HAF |
| 1939 | USC | DiS |
| 1940 | Stanford | BR, HAF, PS |
| 1954 | UCLA | FWAA, UPI |
| 1960 | Washington | HAF |
| 1962 | USC | AP, FWAA, NFF, UPI |
| 1967 | USC | AP, FWAA, NFF, UPI |
| 1972 | USC | AP, FWAA, NFF, UPI |
| 1974 | USC | FWAA, NFF, UPI |
| 1976 | USC | B(QPRS), BR, CFRA, DeS, DuS, MGR |
| 1978 | USC | UPI |
| 1979 | USC | CFRA |
| 1984 | Washington | B (QPRS), FN, NCF |
| 1990 | Washington | R (FACT) |
| 1991 | Washington | FWAA, UPI/NFF, USAT/CNN |
| 2002 | USC | DuS, MGR, SR |
| 2003 | USC | AP, FWAA |
| 2004 | USC | AP, NFF |

† The NCAA does not officially declare football national championships. Various polls, formulas, and other third-party systems have been used to determine national championships, not all of which are universally accepted. The various polls were often not unanimous, resulting in more than one team sharing a title, and mathematical systems were sometimes applied retroactively to determine championships. Furthermore, schools determined by one or more selectors as champions, do not necessarily claim the title.

- Italics indicate retroactive or minor selector.
- USC claims 11 national football championships, California claims 5, Arizona State, Stanford and Washington each claim 2, and Colorado and UCLA each claim 1 championship.

=== Women's Sports ===
Cross Country (11)
| Year | School |
|---|---|
| 1983 | Oregon* |
| 1987 | Oregon |
| 1996 | Stanford |
| 2003 | Stanford |
| 2005 | Stanford |
| 2006 | Stanford |
| 2007 | Stanford |
| 2008 | Washington |
| 2012 | Oregon |
| 2016 | Oregon |
| 2018 | Colorado |

Soccer (7)
| Year | School |
|---|---|
| 2007 | USC |
| 2011 | Stanford |
| 2013 | UCLA |
| 2016 | USC |
| 2017 | Stanford |
| 2019 | Stanford |
| 2022 | UCLA |

Volleyball (17)
| Year | School |
|---|---|
| 1981 | USC* |
| 1984 | UCLA* |
| 1990 | UCLA |
| 1991 | UCLA |
| 1992 | Stanford |
| 1994 | Stanford |
| 1996 | Stanford |
| 1997 | Stanford |
| 2001 | Stanford |
| 2002 | USC |
| 2003 | USC |
| 2004 | Stanford |
| 2005 | Washington |
| 2011 | UCLA |
| 2016 | Stanford |
| 2018 | Stanford |
| 2019 | Stanford |

* The conference now known as the Pac-12 did not sponsor women's sports until the 1986–87 school year, when it was known as the Pacific-10 Conference. Oregon won its 1983 women's cross country title as a member of the Northern Pacific Conference, while USC in 1981 and UCLA in 1984 won women's volleyball titles as members of the Western Collegiate Athletic Association.

== Winter Sports ==
=== Men's Sports ===
Basketball (15)
| Year | School |
|---|---|
| 1939 | Oregon |
| 1942 | Stanford |
| 1959 | California |
| 1964 | UCLA |
| 1965 | UCLA |
| 1967 | UCLA |
| 1968 | UCLA |
| 1969 | UCLA |
| 1970 | UCLA |
| 1971 | UCLA |
| 1972 | UCLA |
| 1973 | UCLA |
| 1975 | UCLA |
| 1995 | UCLA |
| 1997 | Arizona |

Swimming & Diving (28)
| Year | School |
|---|---|
| 1960 | USC |
| 1963 | USC |
| 1964 | USC |
| 1965 | USC |
| 1966 | USC |
| 1967 | Stanford |
| 1974 | USC |
| 1975 | USC |
| 1976 | USC |
| 1977 | USC |
| 1979 | California |
| 1980 | California |
| 1982 | UCLA |
| 1985 | Stanford |
| 1986 | Stanford |
| 1987 | Stanford |
| 1992 | Stanford |
| 1993 | Stanford |
| 1994 | Stanford |
| 1998 | Stanford |
| 2008 | Arizona State |
| 2011 | California |
| 2012 | California |
| 2014 | California |
| 2019 | California |
| 2022 | California |
| 2023 | California |
| 2024 | Arizona State |

Indoor Track & Field (9)
| Year | School |
|---|---|
| 1967 | USC |
| 1972 | USC |
| 1977 | Washington State |
| 2008 | Arizona State |
| 2009 | Oregon |
| 2014 | Oregon |
| 2015 | Oregon |
| 2016 | Oregon |
| 2021 | Oregon |

Wrestling (1)
| Year | School |
|---|---|
| 1988 | Arizona State |

=== Women's Sports ===
Basketball (5)
| Year | School |
|---|---|
| 1983 | USC |
| 1984 | USC |
| 1990 | Stanford |
| 1992 | Stanford |
| 2021 | Stanford |

Gymnastics (7)
| Year | School |
|---|---|
| 1997 | UCLA |
| 2000 | UCLA |
| 2001 | UCLA |
| 2003 | UCLA |
| 2004 | UCLA |
| 2010 | UCLA |
| 2018 | UCLA |

Swimming & Diving (17)
| Year | School |
|---|---|
| 1983 | Stanford* |
| 1989 | Stanford |
| 1992 | Stanford |
| 1993 | Stanford |
| 1994 | Stanford |
| 1995 | Stanford |
| 1996 | Stanford |
| 1997 | USC |
| 1998 | Stanford |
| 2008 | Arizona |
| 2009 | California |
| 2011 | California |
| 2012 | California |
| 2015 | California |
| 2017 | Stanford |
| 2018 | Stanford |
| 2019 | Stanford |

Indoor Track & Field (11)
| Year | School |
|---|---|
| 2000 | UCLA |
| 2001 | UCLA |
| 2007 | Arizona State |
| 2008 | Arizona State |
| 2010 | Oregon |
| 2011 | Oregon |
| 2012 | Oregon |
| 2013 | Oregon |
| 2014 | Oregon |
| 2016 | Oregon |
| 2017 | Oregon |

* As noted above, the then-Pac-10 did not sponsor women's sports until 1986–87. Stanford won its 1983 women's swimming and diving championship as a member of the Western Collegiate Athletic Association.

== Spring Sports ==
=== Men's Sports ===
Baseball (24)
| Year | School |
|---|---|
| 1947 | California |
| 1948 | USC |
| 1957 | California |
| 1958 | USC |
| 1961 | USC |
| 1963 | USC |
| 1968 | USC |
| 1970 | USC |
| 1971 | USC |
| 1972 | USC |
| 1973 | USC |
| 1974 | USC |
| 1978 | USC |
| 1980 | Arizona |
| 1981 | Arizona State |
| 1986 | Arizona |
| 1987 | Stanford |
| 1988 | Stanford |
| 1998 | USC |
| 2006 | Oregon State |
| 2007 | Oregon State |
| 2012 | Arizona |
| 2013 | UCLA |
| 2018 | Oregon State |

Golf (16)
| Year | School |
|---|---|
| 1938 | Stanford |
| 1939 | Stanford |
| 1941 | Stanford |
| 1942 | Stanford(co) |
| 1946 | Stanford |
| 1953 | Stanford |
| 1988 | UCLA |
| 1990 | Arizona State |
| 1992 | Arizona |
| 1994 | Stanford |
| 1996 | Arizona State |
| 2004 | California |
| 2007 | Stanford |
| 2008 | UCLA |
| 2016 | Oregon |
| 2019 | Stanford |

Tennis (54)
| Year | School |
|---|---|
| 1946 | USC |
| 1950 | UCLA |
| 1951 | USC |
| 1952 | UCLA |
| 1953 | UCLA |
| 1954 | UCLA |
| 1955 | USC |
| 1956 | UCLA |
| 1958 | USC |
| 1960 | UCLA |
| 1961 | UCLA |
| 1962 | USC |
| 1963 | USC |
| 1964 | USC |
| 1965 | UCLA |
| 1966 | USC |
| 1967 | USC |
| 1968 | USC |
| 1969 | USC |
| 1970 | UCLA |
| 1971 | UCLA |
| 1973 | Stanford |
| 1974 | Stanford |
| 1975 | UCLA |
| 1976 | UCLA & USC |
| 1977 | Stanford |
| 1978 | Stanford |
| 1979 | UCLA |
| 1980 | Stanford |
| 1981 | Stanford |
| 1982 | UCLA |
| 1983 | Stanford |
| 1984 | UCLA |
| 1986 | Stanford |
| 1988 | Stanford |
| 1989 | Stanford |
| 1990 | Stanford |
| 1991 | USC |
| 1992 | Stanford |
| 1993 | USC |
| 1994 | USC |
| 1995 | Stanford |
| 1996 | Stanford |
| 1997 | Stanford |
| 1998 | Stanford |
| 2000 | Stanford |
| 2002 | USC |
| 2005 | UCLA |
| 2009 | USC |
| 2010 | USC |
| 2011 | USC |
| 2012 | USC |
| 2014 | USC |

Outdoor Track & Field (45)
| Year | School |
|---|---|
| 1922 | California |
| 1925 | Stanford |
| 1926 | USC |
| 1928 | Stanford |
| 1930 | USC |
| 1931 | USC |
| 1934 | Stanford |
| 1935 | USC |
| 1936 | USC |
| 1937 | USC |
| 1938 | USC |
| 1939 | USC |
| 1940 | USC |
| 1941 | USC |
| 1942 | USC |
| 1943 | USC |
| 1949 | USC |
| 1950 | USC |
| 1951 | USC |
| 1952 | USC |
| 1953 | USC |
| 1954 | USC |
| 1955 | USC |
| 1956 | UCLA |
| 1958 | USC |
| 1961 | USC |
| 1963 | USC |
| 1964 | Oregon |
| 1965 | USC & Oregon |
| 1966 | UCLA |
| 1967 | USC |
| 1968 | USC |
| 1970 | Oregon (co) |
| 1971 | UCLA |
| 1972 | UCLA |
| 1973 | UCLA |
| 1976 | USC |
| 1978 | UCLA (co) |
| 1984 | Oregon |
| 1987 | UCLA |
| 1988 | UCLA |
| 2000 | Stanford |
| 2014 | Oregon |
| 2015 | Oregon |

*The NCAA started sponsoring the intercollegiate golf championship in 1939, but it retained the titles from the 41 championships previously conferred by the National Intercollegiate Golf Association in its records. Stanford won one of these pre-NCAA titles in 1938.

=== Women's Sports ===
Golf (21)
| Year | School |
|---|---|
| 1990 | Arizona State |
| 1991 | UCLA |
| 1993 | Arizona State |
| 1994 | Arizona State |
| 1995 | Arizona State |
| 1996 | Arizona |
| 1997 | Arizona State |
| 1998 | Arizona State |
| 2000 | Arizona |
| 2003 | USC |
| 2004 | UCLA |
| 2008 | USC |
| 2009 | Arizona State |
| 2011 | UCLA |
| 2013 | USC |
| 2015 | Stanford |
| 2016 | Washington |
| 2017 | Arizona State |
| 2018 | Arizona |
| 2022 | Stanford |
| 2024 | Stanford |

Rowing (11)
| Year | School |
|---|---|
| 1997 | Washington |
| 1998 | Washington |
| 2001 | Washington |
| 2005 | California |
| 2006 | California (co) |
| 2009 | Stanford |
| 2016 | California |
| 2017 | Washington |
| 2018 | California |
| 2019 | Washington |
| 2023 | Stanford |

Softball (24)
| Year | School |
|---|---|
| 1982 | UCLA* |
| 1984 | UCLA* |
| 1985 | UCLA* |
| 1988 | UCLA |
| 1989 | UCLA |
| 1990 | UCLA |
| 1991 | Arizona |
| 1992 | UCLA |
| 1993 | Arizona |
| 1994 | Arizona |
| 1996 | Arizona |
| 1997 | Arizona |
| 1999 | UCLA |
| 2001 | Arizona |
| 2002 | California |
| 2003 | UCLA |
| 2004 | UCLA |
| 2006 | Arizona |
| 2007 | Arizona |
| 2008 | Arizona State |
| 2009 | Washington |
| 2010 | UCLA |
| 2011 | Arizona State |
| 2019 | UCLA |

Tennis (24)
| Year | School |
|---|---|
| 1982 | Stanford* |
| 1983 | USC* |
| 1984 | Stanford* |
| 1985 | USC* |
| 1986 | Stanford* |
| 1987 | Stanford |
| 1988 | Stanford |
| 1989 | Stanford |
| 1990 | Stanford |
| 1991 | Stanford |
| 1997 | Stanford |
| 1999 | Stanford |
| 2001 | Stanford |
| 2002 | Stanford |
| 2004 | Stanford |
| 2005 | Stanford |
| 2006 | Stanford |
| 2008 | UCLA |
| 2010 | Stanford |
| 2013 | Stanford |
| 2014 | UCLA |
| 2016 | Stanford |
| 2018 | Stanford |
| 2019 | Stanford |

Outdoor Track & Field (10)
| Year | School |
|---|---|
| 1982 | UCLA* |
| 1983 | UCLA* |
| 1985 | Oregon* |
| 2001 | USC |
| 2004 | UCLA |
| 2007 | Arizona State |
| 2015 | Oregon |
| 2017 | Oregon |
| 2018 | USC |
| 2021 | USC |

Beach Volleyball (8)
| Year | School |
|---|---|
| 2016 | USC |
| 2017 | USC |
| 2018 | UCLA |
| 2019 | UCLA |
| 2021 | USC |
| 2022 | USC |
| 2023 | USC |
| 2024 | USC |

* As noted previously, the then-Pac-10 did not sponsor women's sports until 1986–87.

- UCLA: Three national championships in softball (1982, 1984, 1985) and two in women's outdoor track and field (1982, 1983) were won as a member of the Western Collegiate Athletic Association (WCAA).
- Stanford: Three national championships in women's tennis (1982, 1984, 1986) were won as a member of the WCAA (known as the Pacific West Conference in the 1985–86 school year).
- USC: Two national championships in women's tennis (1983, 1985) were won as a member of the WCAA.
- Oregon: One national championship in women's track and field (1985) was won as a member of the Northern Pacific Conference.

== Other NCAA championships ==
The following are NCAA championships won by full Pac-12 members but in sports not sponsored by the Pac-12

=== Men's Sports ===
Boxing (4)
| Year | School |
|---|---|
| 1937 | Washington State |
| 1940 | Idaho |
| 1941 | Idaho |
| 1950 | Idaho |

Gymnastics (18)
| Year | School |
|---|---|
| 1962 | USC |
| 1968 | California |
| 1975 | California |
| 1986 | Arizona State |
| 1987 | UCLA |
| 1992 | Stanford |
| 1993 | Stanford |
| 1995 | Stanford |
| 1997 | California |
| 1998 | California |
| 2009 | Stanford |
| 2011 | Stanford |
| 2019 | Stanford |
| 2021 | Stanford |
| 2022 | Stanford |
| 2023 | Stanford |
| 2024 | Stanford |

Water Polo (50)
| Year | School |
|---|---|
| 1969 | UCLA |
| 1971 | UCLA |
| 1972 | UCLA |
| 1973 | California |
| 1974 | California |
| 1975 | California |
| 1976 | Stanford |
| 1977 | California |
| 1978 | Stanford |
| 1980 | Stanford |
| 1981 | Stanford |
| 1983 | California |
| 1984 | California |
| 1985 | Stanford |
| 1986 | Stanford |
| 1987 | California |
| 1988 | California |
| 1990 | California |
| 1991 | California |
| 1992 | California |
| 1993 | Stanford |
| 1994 | Stanford |
| 1995 | UCLA |
| 1996 | UCLA |
| 1998 | USC |
| 1999 | UCLA |
| 2000 | UCLA |
| 2001 | Stanford |
| 2002 | Stanford |
| 2003 | USC |
| 2004 | UCLA |
| 2005 | USC |
| 2006 | California |
| 2007 | California |
| 2008 | USC |
| 2009 | USC |
| 2010 | USC |
| 2011 | USC |
| 2012 | USC |
| 2013 | USC |
| 2014 | UCLA |
| 2015 | UCLA |
| 2016 | California |
| 2017 | UCLA |
| 2018 | USC |
| 2019 | Stanford |
| 2020 | UCLA |
| 2021 | California |
| 2022 | California |
| 2023 | California |

Volleyball (27)
| Year | School |
|---|---|
| 1970 | UCLA |
| 1971 | UCLA |
| 1972 | UCLA |
| 1974 | UCLA |
| 1975 | UCLA |
| 1976 | UCLA |
| 1977 | USC |
| 1979 | UCLA |
| 1980 | USC |
| 1981 | UCLA |
| 1982 | UCLA |
| 1983 | UCLA |
| 1984 | UCLA |
| 1987 | UCLA |
| 1988 | USC |
| 1989 | UCLA |
| 1990 | USC |
| 1993 | UCLA |
| 1995 | UCLA |
| 1996 | UCLA |
| 1997 | Stanford |
| 1998 | UCLA |
| 2000 | UCLA |
| 2006 | UCLA |
| 2010 | Stanford |
| 2023 | UCLA |
| 2024 | UCLA |

=== Women's Sports ===
Water Polo (23)
| Year | School |
|---|---|
| 2001 | UCLA |
| 2002 | Stanford |
| 2003 | UCLA |
| 2004 | USC |
| 2005 | UCLA |
| 2006 | UCLA |
| 2007 | UCLA |
| 2008 | UCLA |
| 2009 | UCLA |
| 2010 | USC |
| 2011 | Stanford |
| 2012 | Stanford |
| 2013 | USC |
| 2014 | Stanford |
| 2015 | Stanford |
| 2016 | USC |
| 2017 | Stanford |
| 2018 | USC |
| 2019 | Stanford |
| 2021 | USC |
| 2022 | Stanford |
| 2023 | Stanford |
| 2024 | UCLA |

=== Combined Sports ===
Skiing (8)
| Year | School |
|---|---|
| 2013 | Colorado |
| 2015 | Colorado |
| 2017 | Utah |
| 2019 | Utah |
| 2021 | Utah |
| 2022 | Utah |
| 2023 | Utah |
| 2024 | Colorado |

== AIAW national championships ==
| Institution | Nickname | Total AIAW titles |
|---|---|---|
| Arizona State University | Sun Devils | 12 |
| University of California, Los Angeles | Bruins | 8 |
| University of Southern California | Trojans | 6 |
| University of Utah | Utes | 4 (Note: Includes Utah's one cross-country national championship, which was won at the AIAW Division II level.) |
| University of Arizona | Wildcats | 2 |
| Stanford University | Cardinal | 2 |
| University of Colorado | Buffaloes | 1 |
| University of Washington | Huskies | 1 |

Mary Budke of Oregon State won the 1974 AIAW individual collegiate golf national championship.

== See also ==
- List of NCAA schools with the most NCAA Division I championships
- List of NCAA schools with the most Division I national championships
- List of NCAA schools with the most AIAW Division I national championships
- List of college athletics championship game outcomes
- Mythical national championship
