= Central Islip, New York =

- Hamlet and census-designated place
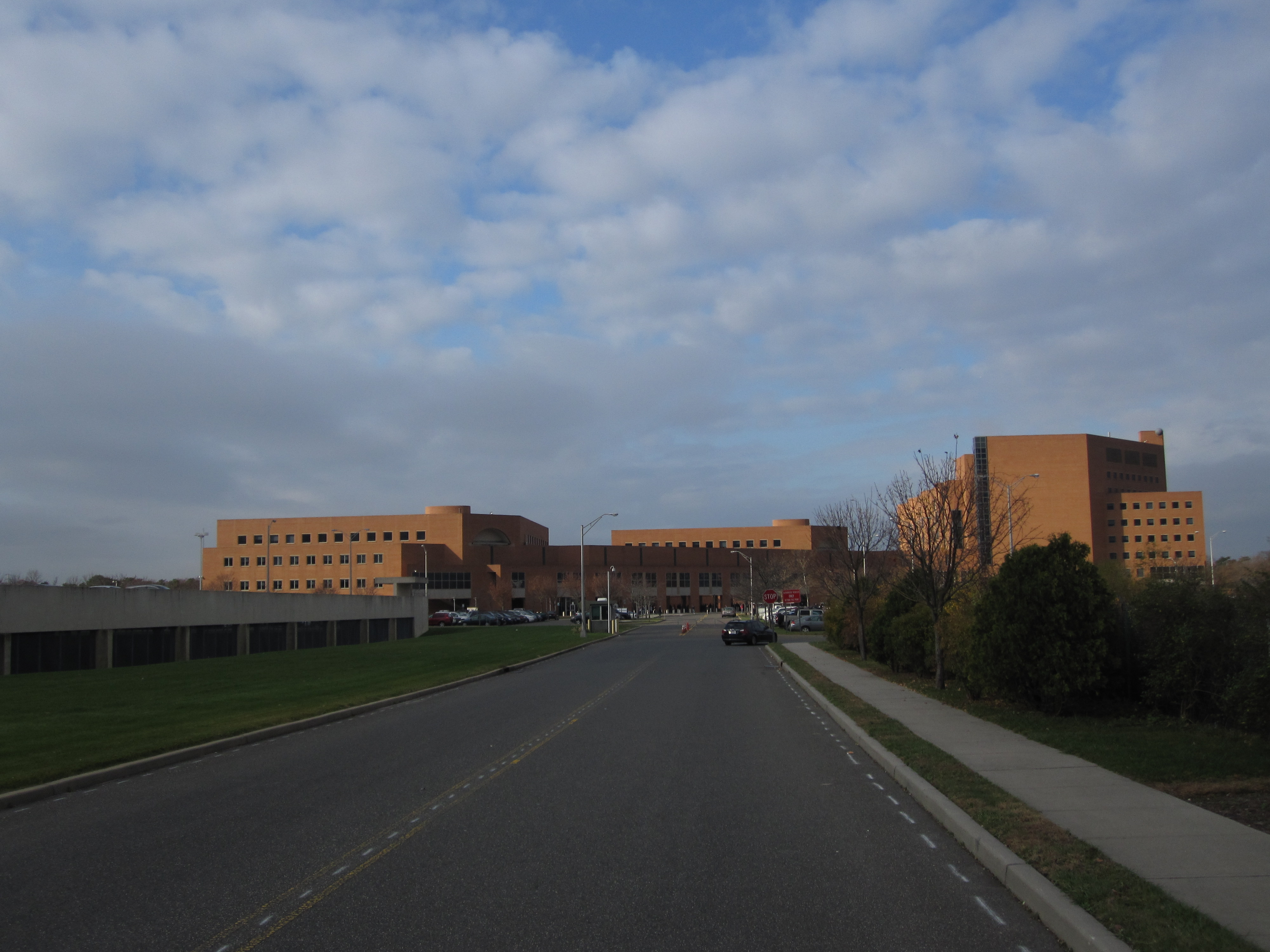
- The Suffolk County court buildings in Central Islip in 2009.

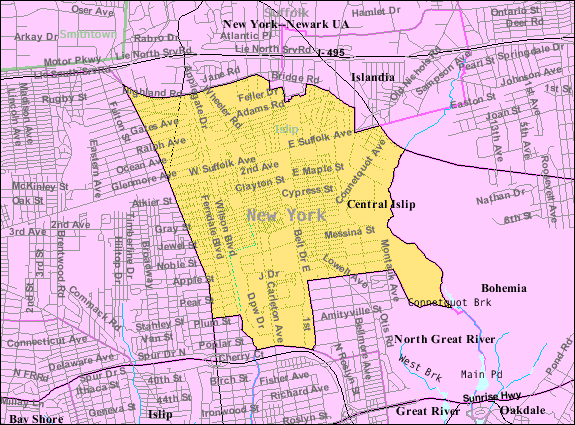
- U.S. census map

- Location within the state of New York
- Coordinates: 40°47′3″N 73°11′57″W
- Country: United States
- State: New York
- County: Suffolk
- Town: Islip

Area
  - Total: 7.15 sq mi (18.53 km^{2})
  - Land: 7.15 sq mi (18.53 km^{2})
  - Water: 0 sq mi (0.00 km^{2})
- Elevation: 85 ft (26 m)

Population (2020)
  - Total: 36,714
  - Density: 5,131.5/sq mi (1,981.27/km^{2})
- Time zone: UTC-5 (Eastern (EST))
  - Summer (DST): UTC-4 (EDT)
- ZIP codes: 11722, 11749, 11760
- Area codes: 631, 934
- FIPS code: 36-13552
- GNIS feature ID: 0946246

Central Islip (also known locally by its initials as CI) is a hamlet and census-designated place (CDP) within the Town of Islip in Suffolk County, New York, United States. As of the 2020 census, Central Islip had a population of 36,714.

== History and overview ==
Prior to the arrival of European settlers, the Secatogue tribe of Algonquin native-American people lived in the area now known as Central Islip.

In 1842, the Long Island Rail Road's eastward expansion reached the area, and the Suffolk County Station was opened up. The Suffolk County Station, became the commercial center for housing. With that being done the name Central Islip was thus born, and applied to a new station built in 1873 further to the east. The modern Central Islip station is in a different location from all of its predecessors.

In 1889, what became the Central Islip Psychiatric Center opened. By 1955, it housed over 10,000 patients. It closed in 1996.

In the mid-1990s, Central Islip began a resurgence, with new housing developments, commercial properties, and government complexes. A new federal courthouse complex opened, claimed to be the second largest in the country. On part of the site of the former Central Islip Psychiatric Center's 788-acre (3.19 km^{2}) campus. In 2000, the baseball stadium for Independent league team Long Island Ducks opened up.

Housing developments in Central Islip include:

- College Woods
- Park Row
- Bella Casa Estates
- Islip Landing
- Courthouse Commons
- Waddington Estates
- Hawthorne Court (Home Properties)
- Coventry Village

== Geography ==
According to the United States Census Bureau, the CDP has a total area of 7.1 square miles (18.4 km^{2}), all land.

== Demographics ==
Historical population
Census	Pop.	Note	%±
2000	31,950		—
2010	34,450		7.8%
2020	36,714		6.6%
U.S. Decennial Census

=== 2020 census ===
As of the 2020 census, Central Islip had a population of 36,714. The median age was 35.6 years. 24.2% of residents were under the age of 18 and 11.9% of residents were 65 years of age or older. For every 100 females there were 97.0 males, and for every 100 females age 18 and over there were 94.0 males age 18 and over.

100.0% of residents lived in urban areas, while 0.0% lived in rural areas.

There were 9,870 households in Central Islip, of which 40.1% had children under the age of 18 living in them. Of all households, 41.8% were married-couple households, 18.1% were households with a male householder and no spouse or partner present, and 32.3% were households with a female householder and no spouse or partner present. About 21.5% of all households were made up of individuals and 9.3% had someone living alone who was 65 years of age or older.

There were 10,344 housing units, of which 4.6% were vacant. The homeowner vacancy rate was 1.5% and the rental vacancy rate was 4.6%.

Racial composition as of the 2020 census
Race	Number	Percent
White	8,176	22.3%
Black or African American	7,463	20.3%
American Indian and Alaska Native	608	1.7%
Asian	1,122	3.1%
Native Hawaiian and Other Pacific Islander	18	0.0%
Some other race	13,346	36.4%
Two or more races	5,981	16.3%
Hispanic or Latino (of any race)	21,856	59.5%

=== 2010 census ===
As of the 2010 census, there were 34,450 people, 8,792 households, and 6,813 families residing in the CDP. The population density was 4,398.2 inhabitants per square mile (1,698.2/km^{2}). There were 9,189 housing units at an average density of 1,264.9 per square mile (488.4/km^{2}). The racial makeup of the CDP was 43.6% White, 25.0% African American, 3.4% Asian, 0.9% from other races, and 5.9% from two or more races. Hispanic or Latino of any race were 52.1% of the population. Foreign-born residents comprised 34.7% of the population.

There were 8,792 households, out of which 26.6% had children under the age of 18 living with them, 8.0% were persons under the age of 5, 3.5% were married couples living together, 17.7% had a female householder with no husband present, and 22.5% were non-families. 16.8% of all households were made up of individuals, and 8.5% had someone living alone who was 65 years of age or older. The average household size was 3.56 and the average family size was 3.87.

In the CDP, the population was spread out, with 29.2% under the age of 18, 11.0% from 18 to 24, 32.5% from 25 to 44, 19.8% from 45 to 64, and 7.4% who were 65 years of age or older. The median age was 32 years. For every 100 females, there were 97.5 males. For every 100 females age 18 and over, there were 93.3 males.

The median income for a household in the CDP was $55,504, and the median income for a family was $57,252. Males had a median income of $35,187 versus $27,842 for females. The per capita income for the CDP was $17,910. About 8.3% of families and 11.4% of the population were below the poverty line, including 15.8% of those under age 18 and 8.7% of those age 65 or over.

The racial/ethnic breakdown from the 2010 census was as follows:

- 43.6% White
- 25.0% Black
- 0.9% Native American
- 3.4% Asian
- 0.0% Native Hawaiian
- 0.4% Some other race
- 5.9% Two or more races

In addition, 52.1% was of Hispanic origin.

== Schools ==
The Central Islip Union Free School District operates public schools.

- Pre-K and K
  - Early Childhood Center (Alfano)
- Grades 1–6
  - Andrew T. Morrow Elementary
  - Francis J. O'Neil Elementary
  - Marguerite Mulvey Elementary
  - Cordello Ave. Elementary
  - Mulligan Elementary
  - Anthony Alfano Elementary
- Grades 7–8
  - Ralph G. Reed Middle School
- Grades 9–12
  - Central Islip Senior High School

Central Islip was home to NYIT (the New York Institute of Technology) and Touro Law Center, located next to the local New York Supreme Court building. The only remaining Catholic school, Our Lady of Providence, was closed after the 2021–21 academic year and consolidated with another Suffolk County parish school to form Our Lady of Guadalupe at nearby Deer Park.

== Churches ==
- Central Islip Seventh-Day Adventist Church, 143 Caleb's Path
- Central Islip Church of Christ
- First Spanish Baptist Church, 51 Hawthorne Avenue
- The First United Methodist Church (Dating back to 1869) on Wheeler Rd.
- Iglesia Fuente de Agua Viva, 100 East Suffolk Ave Central Islip NY 11722
- Iglesia Bíblica TorreFuerte (Pastores: Bayardo & Ady Delgadillo)
- Iglesia Evangelica Resurreccion
- Ministerio Jesu Cristo Vive, 1417 Islip Avenue
- Lighthouse Tabernacle Church of God
- St. John of God Roman Catholic Church (one of the oldest churches in Central Islip)
- The Episcopal Church of The Messiah; {Episcopal Church}
- Kingdom Hall of Jehovah's Witnesses, 268 Suffolk Avenue
- Kingdom Hall of Jehovah's Witnesses, 105 Fig Street
- Restoring Grace Ministries

== Transportation ==
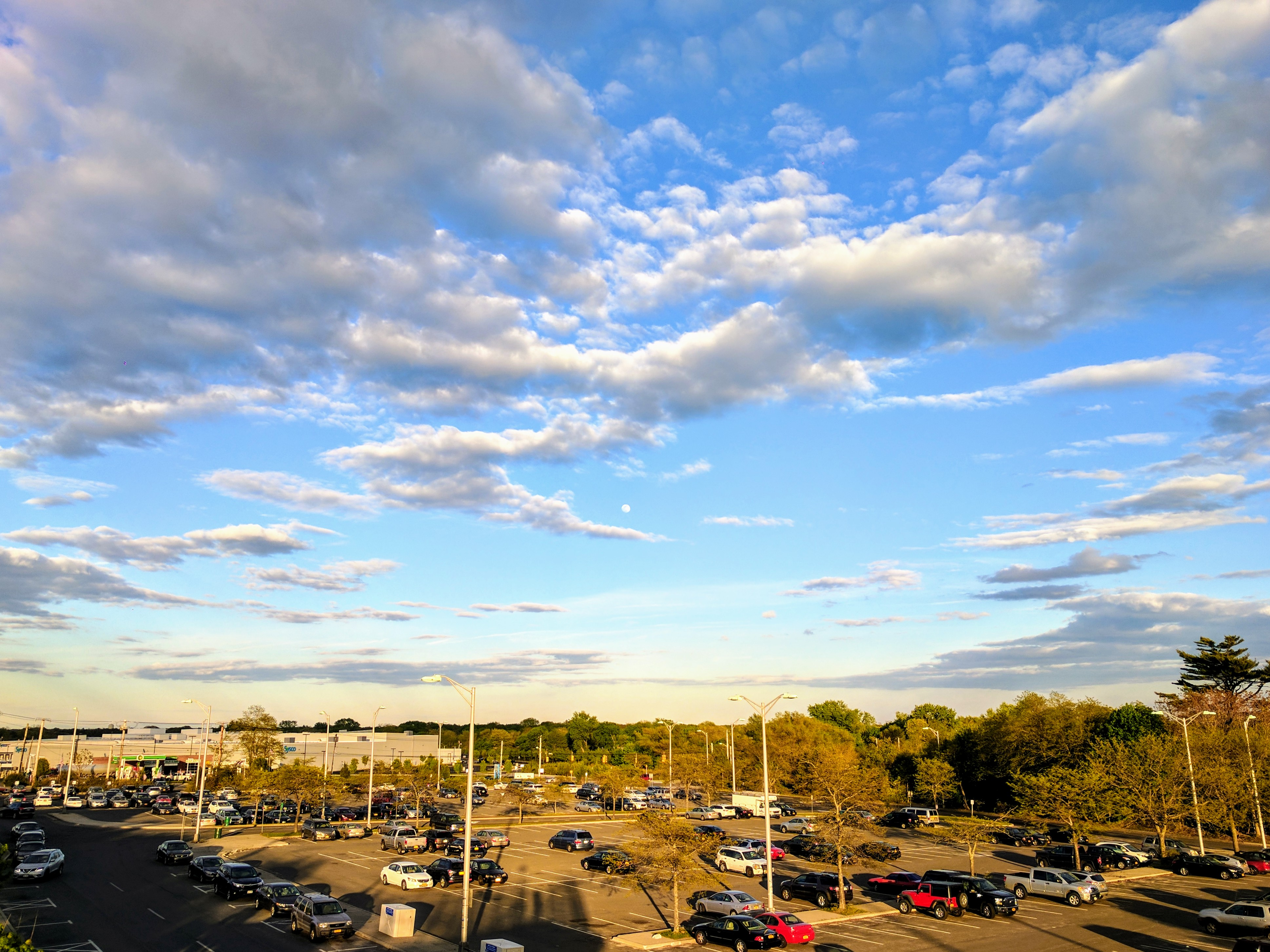
A birds eye view of Central Islip LIRR parking area from foot over bridge.

=== Roads ===
Major roads within the hamlet of Islip are:

- CR 17, also known as Carleton Avenue through most of the community and Wheeler's Road north of Suffolk Avenue, runs parallel to NY 111 (Islip Avenue) from its southern terminus at NY 27A in Islip to its northern terminus at NY 111 near the Long Island Expressway at Exit 56 in Hauppauge.
- CR 67, also known as the Long Island Motor Parkway runs along the northern edge of the community.
- CR 100, also known as Suffolk Avenue, is the main west-to-east route through the community, running from Suffolk County Road 13 in Brentwood to NY 454 in Islandia.
- Heckscher State Parkway (Exit 43A) runs within nearby Islip Terrace but is close enough to the Islip Terrace/Central Islip border.

=== Airport ===
Islip Terrace is west of Long Island MacArthur Airport in Ronkonkoma.

=== Train ===
Central Islip Station is located along the Ronkonkoma Branch of the Long Island Rail Road.

=== Buses ===
There are many bus stops going through Central Islip along the 4, 6, 17, 52A and weekday-only 52B routes on Suffolk County Transit. Buses are operated and maintained by the local Suffolk Transportation Service, Inc.

== Sports ==
Club	Sport	League	Venue	Logo
Long Island Ducks	Baseball	Atlantic League of Professional Baseball	Fairfield Properties Ballpark	Link to file

== Notable people ==
- Roy Barker, football player
- Matt Chulis, soccer player and coach
- Anthony Cumia, shock jock
- K-Solo, rapper
- Rick Kittles, biologist
- Chrisette Michele, singer
- Keith Murray, rapper
- R.A. the Rugged Man, rapper
- Mike Tice, football player and coach
