= 2021 Alabama Crimson Tide football team =

American college football season

2021 Alabama Crimson Tide football

SEC champion SEC Western Division champion Cotton Bowl Classic champion

SEC Championship Game, W 41–24 vs. Georgia

Cotton Bowl Classic (CFP semifinal), W 27–6 vs. Cincinnati CFP National Championship, L 18–33 vs. Georgia
- Conference: Southeastern Conference
- Western Division

Ranking
- Coaches: No. 2
- AP: No. 2
- Record: 13–2 (7–1 SEC)
- Head coach: Nick Saban (15th season)
- Offensive coordinator: Bill O'Brien (1st season)
- Offensive scheme: Pro spread
- Defensive coordinator: Pete Golding (4th season)
- Co-defensive coordinator: Charles Kelly (3rd season)
- Base defense: 4–2–5
- Home stadium: Bryant–Denny Stadium

Uniform
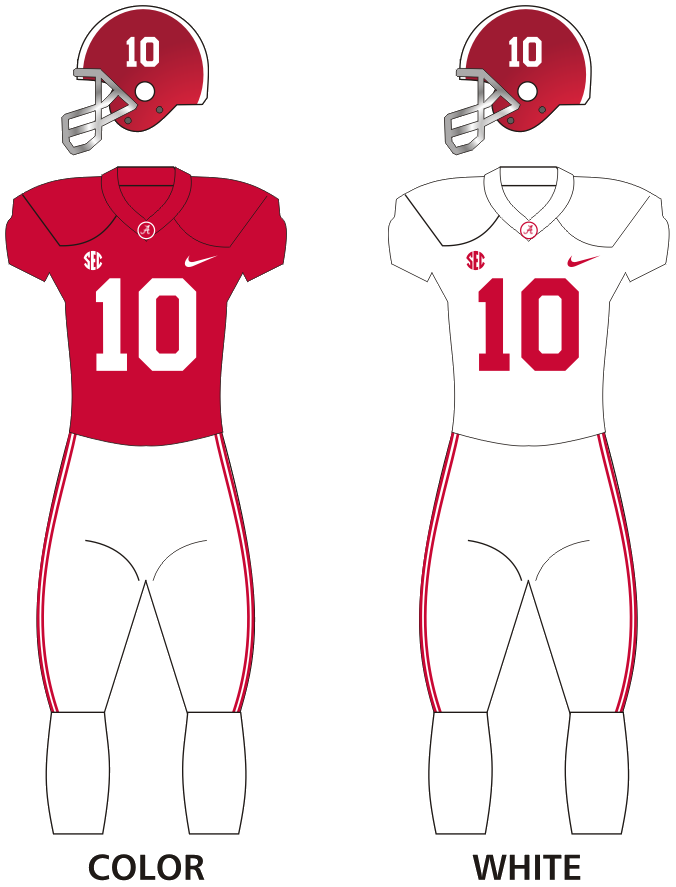

2021 Southeastern Conference football standings
| | Conf. | | | Overall |
| Team | W | | L | W | | L |
|---|---|---|---|---|---|---|
Eastern Division
| No. 1 Georgia x#^ | 8 | – | 0 | 14 | – | 1 |
| No. 18 Kentucky* | 5 | – | 3 | 10 | – | 3 |
| Tennessee | 4 | – | 4 | 7 | – | 6 |
| Missouri | 3 | – | 5 | 6 | – | 7 |
| South Carolina | 3 | – | 5 | 7 | – | 6 |
| Florida | 2 | – | 6 | 6 | – | 7 |
| Vanderbilt | 0 | – | 8 | 2 | – | 10 |
Western Division
| No. 2 Alabama x$^ | 7 | – | 1 | 13 | – | 2 |
| No. 11 Ole Miss | 6 | – | 2 | 10 | – | 3 |
| No. 21 Arkansas | 4 | – | 4 | 9 | – | 4 |
| Mississippi State | 4 | – | 4 | 7 | – | 6 |
| Texas A&M | 4 | – | 4 | 8 | – | 4 |
| Auburn | 3 | – | 5 | 6 | – | 7 |
| LSU | 3 | – | 5 | 6 | – | 7 |
Championship: Alabama 41, Georgia 24
# – College Football Playoff champion; ^ – College Football Playoff participant; $ – Conference champion; x – Division champion/co-champions; * – Kentucky vacated all wins due to NCAA violations.; Rankings from AP Poll

The 2021 Alabama Crimson Tide football team (variously "Alabama", "Bama", or "The Tide") represented the University of Alabama in the 2021 NCAA Division I FBS football season. This season marked the Crimson Tide's 127th overall season, 88th as a member of the Southeastern Conference (SEC), and 30th within the SEC Western Division. They played their home games at Bryant–Denny Stadium in Tuscaloosa, Alabama, and were led by 15th-year head coach Nick Saban.

Alabama entered the 2021 season as the defending consensus national champions and SEC champions and appeared in the 2022 College Football National Championship to defend their title against Georgia in a rematch from 2021 SEC Championship Game and 2018 College Football Playoff National Championship, after beating an undefeated Cincinnati in the College Football Playoff Semifinal. Alabama was defeated by Georgia in the National Championship game 33–18.

== Offseason ==
=== NFL draft ===
The following Crimson Tide players were selected in the 2021 NFL Draft. Alabama had six players drafted in the first round, tying Miami (FL) in 2004 for most all time.

| Player | Position | Team | Round | Pick |
|---|---|---|---|---|
| Jaylen Waddle | WR | Miami Dolphins | 1 | 6 |
| Patrick Surtain II | CB | Denver Broncos | 1 | 9 |
| DeVonta Smith | WR | Philadelphia Eagles | 1 | 10 |
| Mac Jones | QB | New England Patriots | 1 | 15 |
| Alex Leatherwood | OT | Las Vegas Raiders | 1 | 17 |
| Najee Harris | RB | Pittsburgh Steelers | 1 | 24 |
| Landon Dickerson | C | Philadelphia Eagles | 2 | 37 |
| Christian Barmore | DT | New England Patriots | 2 | 38 |
| Deonte Brown | OG | Carolina Panthers | 6 | 193 |
| Thomas Fletcher | LS | Carolina Panthers | 6 | 222 |

=== Position key ===
| Back | B | Center | C | Cornerback | CB | Defensive back | DB | | |
| Defensive end | DE | Defensive lineman | DL | Defensive tackle | DT | End | E | | |
| Fullback | FB | Place Kicker | PK | Guard | G | Halfback | HB | Kicker | K |
| Kickoff returner | KR | Offensive tackle | OT | Offensive lineman | OL | Linebacker | LB | | |
| Long snapper | LS | Split end | SE | Punter | P | Punt returner | PR | Quarterback | QB |
| Running back | RB | Safety | S | Tight end | TE | Wide receiver | WR | | |

=== Coaching changes ===
Steve Sarkisian, former offensive coordinator of the Crimson Tide, accepted a position as head football coach of Texas. He was replaced by Bill O'Brien. Charles Huff, former Associate head coach/Running backs coach accepted the head coaching position at Marshall and was replaced by Todd Watson as associate head coach and Robert Gillespie as Running backs coach. Former Special teams coordinator/Tight end coach Jeff Banks left to accept a position as the Assistant Coach/Special teams coordinator/Tight end coach for Texas and was replaced by Jay Graham. Former Cornerbacks coach Karl Scott left and went to fill a position as a Defensive backs coach for the Minnesota Vikings and has been replaced by Jay Valai. Former Offensive line coach Kyle Flood left to be the Offensive coordinator/offensive line coach for Texas and was replaced by Doug Marrone. On March 24, 2021, Jay Graham left the program after only two months of being with the Tide and was replaced by Drew Svoboda.

=== Players ===
2021 Alabama offseason departures
| Name | Number | Pos. | Height | Weight | Year | Hometown | Notes |
|---|---|---|---|---|---|---|---|
| Christian Barmore | 58 | DL | 6’5 | 310 | RS Sophomore | Philadelphia, PA | Declared for NFL Draft |
| Mac Jones | 10 | QB | 6’3 | 210 | RS Junior | Jacksonville, FL | Declared for NFL Draft |
| Patrick Surtain II | 2 | DB | 6’2 | 202 | Junior | Plantation, FL | Declared for NFL Draft |
| Jaylen Waddle | 17 | WR | 5’10 | 182 | Junior | Houston, TX | Declared for NFL Draft |
| Dylan Moses | 32 | LB | 6'3 | 235 | Senior | Alexandria, LA | Graduated/Declared for NFL Draft |
| Carl Tucker | 86 | TE | 6'2 | 248 | Graduate Student | Concord, NC | Graduated/Declared for NFL Draft |
| Joshua McMillon | 40 | LB | 6'3 | 237 | Graduate Student | Memphis, TN | Graduated/Declared for NFL Draft |
| Landon Dickerson | 69 | OL | 6'3 | 325 | Graduate Student | Hickory, NC | Graduated/Declared for NFL Draft |
| DeVonta Smith | 6 | WR | 6'1 | 175 | Senior | Amite, LA | Graduated |
| Logan Burnett | 12 | QB | 6'2 | 200 | Senior | Pelham, AL | Graduated |
| Najee Harris | 22 | RB | 6'3 | 230 | Senior | Antioch, CA | Graduated |
| Christian Swann | 43 | DB | 5'9 | 179 | Senior | Mableton, GA | Graduated |
| Thomas Fletcher | 45 | LS | 6'2 | 220 | Senior | Georgetown, TX | Graduated |
| Joe McDonald | 57 | LB | 6'3 | 216 | RS Senior | Mountain Brook, AL | Graduated |
| Deonte Brown | 65 | OL | 6’4 | 350 | RS Senior | Decatur, AL | Graduated |
| Alex Leatherwood | 70 | OL | 6'6 | 310 | Senior | Pensacola, FL | Graduated |
| Drew Kobayashi | 85 | WR | 6'2 | 200 | RS Senior | Honolulu, HI | Graduated |
| Charlie Scott | 85 | P | 6'1 | 195 | Senior | Greenwood Village, CO | Graduated |
| Miller Forristall | 87 | TE | 6'5 | 242 | Senior | Cartersville, GA | Graduated |

==== Transfers ====
Outgoing

The Crimson Tide lost ten players via transfer from the 2020 season.

| Name | No. | Pos. | Height | Weight | Hometown | Year | New school |
|---|---|---|---|---|---|---|---|
| Ishmael Sopsher | #95 | DT | 6’4 | 334 | Amite, LA | Sophomore | USC |
| Kevin Harris | #44 | LB | 6’4 | 228 | Loganville, GA | Sophomore | Georgia Tech |
| Eddie Smith | #15 | DB | 6’0 | 196 | Slidell, LA | (redshirt) Sophomore | Illinois |
| Joseph Bulovas | #97 | PK | 6’0 | 203 | Mandeville, LA | (redshirt) Junior | Vanderbilt |
| Ben Davis | #1 | LB | 6’4 | 243 | Gordo, AL | (redshirt) Senior | Texas |
| Ale Kaho | #10 | LB | 6’1 | 235 | Reno, NV | Junior | UCLA |
| Ronald Williams Jr. | #22 | DB | 6’2 | 190 | Ferriday, LA | Senior | Michigan State |
| Brandon Turnage | #7 | DB | 6’1 | 186 | Oxford, MS | (redshirt) Sophomore | Tennessee |
| Joshua Lanier | #84 | WR | 5'11 | 160 | Tuscaloosa, AL | (redshirt) Senior | Jackson State |
| Keilan Robinson | #2 | RB | 5’9 | 190 | Washington, DC | Junior | Texas |

Incoming

| Name | No. | Pos. | Height | Weight | Year | Hometown | Prev. school |
|---|---|---|---|---|---|---|---|
| Jameson Williams | #1 | WR | 6'2" | 189 | Sophomore | St. Louis, MO | Ohio State |
| Henry To'oTo'o | 11 | LB | 6'2" | 225 | Sophomore | Sacramento, CA | Tennessee |
| Jack Martin | 43 | K/P | 6'2" | 222 | Sophomore | Dothan, AL | Troy |

=== Recruiting class ===
The Crimson Tide signed a total of 26 scholarship recruits and 1 walk-ons during national signing period.

==== Overall class rankings ====
| Website | Overall rank | Conference rank | 5 star recruits | 4 star recruits | 3 star recruits |
|---|---|---|---|---|---|
| ESPN | #1 | #1 | 3 | 14 | 2 |
| Rivals | #1 | #1 | 4 | 16 | 4 |
| 247 Sports | #1 | #1 | 8 | 14 | 3 |

==== Recruits ====
College recruiting
| Name | Hometown | School | Height | Weight | Commit date |
|---|---|---|---|---|---|
| Tommy Brockermeyer; OT | Fort Worth, TX | All Saints Episcopal School | 6 ft 6 in (1.98 m) | 280 lb (130 kg) | Jul 17, 2020 |
| Tommy Brockermeyer; OT | Recruit ratings: Rivals: 247Sports: ESPN: (91) | | | | |
| JC Latham; OT | Bradenton, FL | IMG Academy | 6 ft 6 in (1.98 m) | 310 lb (140 kg) | Jun 12, 2020 |
| JC Latham; OT | Recruit ratings: Rivals: 247Sports: ESPN: (90) | | | | |
| Dallas Turner; DE | Fort Lauderdale, FL | St. Thomas Aquinas High School | 6 ft 4 in (1.93 m) | 230 lb (100 kg) | Jul 1, 2020 |
| Dallas Turner; DE | Recruit ratings: Rivals: 247Sports: ESPN: (90) | | | | |
| Damon Payne; DT | Belleville, MI | Belleville High School | 6 ft 4 in (1.93 m) | 295 lb (134 kg) | Jul 26, 2020 |
| Damon Payne; DT | Recruit ratings: Rivals: 247Sports: ESPN: (88) | | | | |
| Kool-Aid McKinstry; ATH | Pinson, AL | Pinson Valley High School | 6 ft 0 in (1.83 m) | 175 lb (79 kg) | Oct 25, 2020 |
| Kool-Aid McKinstry; ATH | Recruit ratings: Rivals: 247Sports: ESPN: (87) | | | | |
| Camar Wheaton; RB | Garland, TX | Lakeview Centennial High School | 5 ft 11 in (1.80 m) | 195 lb (88 kg) | Dec 23, 2020 |
| Camar Wheaton; RB | Recruit ratings: Rivals: 247Sports: ESPN: (86) | | | | |
| Ja'Corey Brooks; WR | Miami, FL | Booker T. Washington High School | 6 ft 2 in (1.88 m) | 185 lb (84 kg) | May 8, 2020 |
| Ja'Corey Brooks; WR | Recruit ratings: Rivals: 247Sports: ESPN: (86) | | | | |
| Agiye Hall; WR | Valrico, FL | Bloomingdale High School | 6 ft 3 in (1.91 m) | 190 lb (86 kg) | Apr 18, 2020 |
| Agiye Hall; WR | Recruit ratings: Rivals: 247Sports: ESPN: (86) | | | | |
| JoJo Earle; WR | Aledo, TX | Aledo High School | 5 ft 9 in (1.75 m) | 170 lb (77 kg) | Dec 25, 2020 |
| JoJo Earle; WR | Recruit ratings: Rivals: 247Sports: ESPN: (86) | | | | |
| Christian Leary; ATH | Orlando, FL | Edgewater High School | 5 ft 9 in (1.75 m) | 180 lb (82 kg) | Jun 16, 2020 |
| Christian Leary; ATH | Recruit ratings: Rivals: 247Sports: ESPN: (85) | | | | |
| Terrance Ferguson; OT | Fort Valley, GA | Peach County High School | 6 ft 4 in (1.93 m) | 300 lb (140 kg) | Jul 19, 2020 |
| Terrance Ferguson; OT | Recruit ratings: Rivals: 247Sports: ESPN: (85) | | | | |
| Jaeden Roberts; OG | Houston, TX | North Shore High School | 6 ft 5 in (1.96 m) | 345 lb (156 kg) | Dec 25, 2020 |
| Jaeden Roberts; OG | Recruit ratings: Rivals: 247Sports: ESPN: (84) | | | | |
| James Brockermeyer; OL | Fort Worth, Texas | All Saints Episcopal School | 6 ft 3 in (1.91 m) | 255 lb (116 kg) | Jul 17, 2020 |
| James Brockermeyer; OL | Recruit ratings: Rivals: 247Sports: ESPN: (84) | | | | |
| Deontae Lawson; LB | Mobile, AL | Mobile Christian High School | 6 ft 3 in (1.91 m) | 210 lb (95 kg) | Dec 27, 2019 |
| Deontae Lawson; LB | Recruit ratings: Rivals: 247Sports: ESPN: (84) | | | | |
| Jalen Milroe; QB | Katy, TX | Obra D. Tompkins High School | 6 ft 2 in (1.88 m) | 195 lb (88 kg) | Aug 17, 2020 |
| Jalen Milroe; QB | Recruit ratings: Rivals: 247Sports: ESPN: (84) | | | | |
| Terrion Arnold; S | Tallahassee, FL | St. John Paul II Catholic High School | 6 ft 1 in (1.85 m) | 185 lb (84 kg) | Feb 3, 2021 |
| Terrion Arnold; S | Recruit ratings: Rivals: 247Sports: ESPN: (83) | | | | |
| Kaine Williams; S | Marrero, LA | John Ehret High School | 6 ft 1 in (1.85 m) | 195 lb (88 kg) | May 15, 2020 |
| Kaine Williams; S | Recruit ratings: Rivals: 247Sports: ESPN: (83) | | | | |
| Monkell Goodwine; DE | Fort Washington, MD | National Christian Academy | 6 ft 4 in (1.93 m) | 265 lb (120 kg) | Aug 15, 2020 |
| Monkell Goodwine; DE | Recruit ratings: Rivals: 247Sports: ESPN: (83) | | | | |
| Khyree Jackson; CB | Upper Marlboro, MD | East Mississippi Community College (JC) | 6 ft 4 in (1.93 m) | 265 lb (120 kg) | Aug 15, 2020 |
| Khyree Jackson; CB | Recruit ratings: Rivals: 247Sports: ESPN: (82) | | | | |
| Kendrick Blackshire; LB | Duncanville, TX | Duncanville High School | 6 ft 1 in (1.85 m) | 250 lb (110 kg) | Jul 14, 2020 |
| Kendrick Blackshire; LB | Recruit ratings: Rivals: 247Sports: ESPN: (83) | | | | |
| Ian Jackson; LB | Prattville, AL | Prattville High School | 6 ft 3 in (1.91 m) | 215 lb (98 kg) | May 28, 2020 |
| Ian Jackson; LB | Recruit ratings: Rivals: 247Sports: ESPN: (81) | | | | |
| Keanu Koht; DE | Vero Beach, FL | Vero Beach High School | 6 ft 4 in (1.93 m) | 225 lb (102 kg) | Dec 16, 2020 |
| Keanu Koht; DE | Recruit ratings: Rivals: 247Sports: ESPN: (81) | | | | |
| Tim Keenan; DT | Birmingham, AL | Ramsay High School | 6 ft 2 in (1.88 m) | 340 lb (150 kg) | Aug 29, 2020 |
| Tim Keenan; DT | Recruit ratings: Rivals: 247Sports: ESPN: (80) | | | | |
| Anquin Barnes; DT | Montgomery, AL | Robert E. Lee High School | 6 ft 5 in (1.96 m) | 300 lb (140 kg) | Apr 17, 2020 |
| Anquin Barnes; DT | Recruit ratings: Rivals: 247Sports: ESPN: (80) | | | | |
| Robbie Ouzts; TE | Rock Hill, SC | Rock Hill High School | 6 ft 4 in (1.93 m) | 240 lb (110 kg) | Sep 6, 2020 |
| Robbie Ouzts; TE | Recruit ratings: Rivals: 247Sports: ESPN: (79) | | | | |
| DeVonta Smith; CB | Cincinnati, OH | La Salle High School | 5 ft 11 in (1.80 m) | 180 lb (82 kg) | Jun 29, 2020 |
| DeVonta Smith; CB | Recruit ratings: Rivals: 247Sports: ESPN: (78) | | | | |
Overall recruit ranking: Rivals: #1 247Sports: #1 ESPN: #1
Note: In many cases, Scout, Rivals, 247Sports, On3, and ESPN may conflict in their listings of height and weight.; In these cases, the average was taken. ESPN grades are on a 100-point scale.; Sources: "Rivals commits". Rivals.; "ESPN commits". ESPN.; "2021 Team Ranking". Rivals.com.; "247Sports commits". 247Sports.

=== Returning starters ===
Offense

| Player | Class | Position |
|---|---|---|
| Emil Ekiyor Jr. | Junior | Offensive Line |
| Evan Neal | Junior | Offensive Line |
| Chris Owens | Grad Student | Offensive Line |
| John Metchie III | Junior | Wide Receiver |
| Jahleel Billingsley | Junior | Tight End |

Defense

| Player | Class | Position |
|---|---|---|
| LaBryan Ray | RS Senior | Defensive Line |
| D. J. Dale | Junior | Defensive Line |
| Justin Eboigbe | Junior | Defensive Line |
| Phidarian Mathis | RS Senior | Defensive Line |
| Christian Harris | Junior | Linebacker |
| Christopher Allen | RS Senior | Linebacker |
| Will Anderson Jr. | Sophomore | Linebacker |
| Malachi Moore | Sophomore | Defensive Back |
| Daniel Wright | RS Senior | Defensive Back |
| Jordan Battle | Junior | Defensive Back |
| Josh Jobe | Senior | Defensive Back |

Special teams

| Player | Class | Position |
|---|---|---|
| Will Reichard | Junior | Kicker |

== Preseason ==
=== Award watch lists ===
Listed in the order that they were released

| Award | Player | Position | Year |
|---|---|---|---|
| Lott Trophy | Josh Jobe | DB | Sr. |
| Dodd Trophy | Nick Saban | HC | -- |
| Maxwell Award | Brian Robinson Jr. | RB | GS |
| Maxwell Award | John Metchie III | WR | Sr. |
| Bednarik Award | Will Anderson Jr. | LB | So. |
| Bednarik Award | Josh Jobe | DB | Sr. |
| Doak Walker Award | Brian Robinson Jr. | RB | GS. |
| Biletnikoff Award | John Metchie III | WR | Jr. |
| Biletnikoff Award | Jameson Williams | WR. | Jr. |
| John Mackey Award | Jahleel Billingsley | TE | Jr. |
| Jim Thorpe Award | Jordan Battle | DB | Jr. |
| Jim Thorpe Award | Josh Jobe | DB | Sr. |
| Butkus Award | Will Anderson | LB | So. |
| Butkus Award | Christian Harris | LB | Jr. |
| Butkus Award | Christopher Allen | LB | RS Sr. |
| Outland Trophy | Evan Neal | OL | Jr. |
| Outland Trophy | Phidarian Mathis | DL | RS Sr. |
| Bronko Nagurski Trophy | Josh Jobe | DB | Sr. |
| Bronko Nagurski Trophy | D. J. Dale | DL | Jr. |
| Bronko Nagurski Trophy | Phidarian Mathis | DL | RS Sr. |
| Bronko Nagurski Trophy | Will Anderson | LB | So. |
| Bronko Nagurski Trophy | Christian Harris | LB | Jr. |
| Bronko Nagurski Trophy | Malachi Moore | DB | So. |
| Lou Groza Award | Will Reichard | K | Jr. |
| Wuerffel Trophy | Chris Owens | OL | GS |
| Walter Camp Award | John Metchie III | WR | Sr. |
| Walter Camp Award | Will Anderson | LB | So. |
| Rotary Lombardi Award | Will Anderson | LB | So. |
| Rotary Lombardi Award | Henry To'oTo'o | LB | Jr. |
| Rotary Lombardi Award | Christian Harris | LB | Jr. |
| Rotary Lombardi Award | Phidarian Mathis | DL | RS Sr. |
| Rotary Lombardi Award | Evan Neal | OL | Jr. |
| Rotary Lombardi Award | Emil Ekiyor Jr. | OL | Jr. |
| Polynesian College Football Player Of The Year Award | Cameron Latu | TE | RS Jr. |
| Polynesian College Football Player Of The Year Award | Henry To'oTo'o | LB | Jr. |
| Ted Hendricks Award | Phidarian Mathis | DL | RS Sr. |
| Manning Award | Bryce Young | QB | So. |

=== SEC media days ===
The 2021 SEC Media days will be held in July 19–22, 2021 at the Hyatt Regency Birmingham – The Wynfrey Hotel in Hoover, Alabama. The Preseason Polls will be released on July 23, 2021. Each team had their head coach available to talk to the media at the event. Coverage of the event was televised on SEC Network and ESPN.

Media poll (West Division)
| Predicted finish | Team | Votes (1st place) |
| 1 | Alabama | 932 (130) |
| 2 | Texas A&M | 760 (1) |
| 3 | LSU | 633 (1) |
| 4 | Ole Miss | 529 (1) |
| 5 | Auburn | 440 |
| 6 | Arkansas | 241 (1) |
| 7 | Mississippi State | 217 |

Media poll (SEC Championship)
| Rank | Team | Votes |
| 1 | Alabama | 84 |
| 2 | Georgia | 45 |
| 3 | Ole Miss | 1 |

=== Preseason All-SEC teams (media) ===
The Crimson Tide placed 16 representatives on the Preseason All-SEC Team, including eight on the first team - six on defense.

Offense

1st team

John Metchie III – WR

Evan Neal – OL

2nd team

Jahleel Billingsley - TE

Emil Ekiyor Jr. - OL

3rd team

Brian Robinson Jr. - RB

Defense

1st team

Phidarian Mathis - DL

Henry To'oTo'o – LB

Christian Harris - LB

Josh Jobe - DB

Malachi Moore - DB

2nd team

LaBryan Ray - DL

Jordan Battle - DB

3rd team

D. J. Dale - DL

Christopher Allen - LB

Specialists

2nd team

Will Reichard – K

=== Preseason AP All-Americans ===
Offense

1st team

Evan Neal – OL

2nd team

John Metchie III – WR

Emil Ekiyor Jr. - OL

Defense

1st team

Will Anderson Jr. – LB

2nd team

Christian Harris - LB

=== Preseason All-SEC teams (coaches) ===
The Crimson Tide placed 15 representatives on the Preseason All-SEC Team, including eight on the first team - six on defense.

Offense

1st team

John Metchie III – WR

Evan Neal – OL

2nd team

Jahleel Billingsley - TE

Emil Ekiyor Jr. - OL

3rd team

Brian Robinson Jr. - RB

Defense

1st team

Phidarian Mathis - DL

Will Anderson Jr. – LB

Christian Harris - LB

Josh Jobe - DB

Malachi Moore - DB

2nd team

Henry To'oTo'o - LB

Jordan Battle - DB

3rd team

LaBryan Ray - DL

Christopher Allen - LB

Specialists

3rd team

Will Reichard – K

== Personnel ==
=== Coaching staff ===
| Name | Position | Consecutive season at Alabama in current position |
|---|---|---|
| Nick Saban | Head Coach & Secondary | 15th |
| Bill O'Brien | Offensive coordinator/quarterbacks coach | 1st |
| Pete Golding | Defensive coordinator/Inside linebackers coach | 3rd |
| Charles Kelly | Associate Defensive coordinator/Safeties coach | 3rd |
| Drew Svoboda | Special teams coordinator/Tight end coach | 1st |
| Robert Gillespie | Running backs coach | 1st |
| Jay Valai | Cornerbacks coach | 1st |
| Doug Marrone | Offensive line coach | 1st |
| Holmon Wiggins | Wide receivers coach | 3rd |
| Sal Sunseri | Outside linebackers coach | 3rd |
| Freddie Roach | Defensive line coach | 2nd |
| David Ballou | Strength and conditioning | 2nd |

Graduate assistants

- Max Bullough
- Montana Murphy
- Jamey Mosley
- Manrey Saint-Amour

Analysts

- Dean Altobelli
- George Banko
- Bert Biffani
- Johnathan Galante
- Jake Long
- Alex Mortensen
- Will Lawing
- Ron Cooper
- Mark Oprhey
- Dave Huxtable
- Nick Cochran

=== Roster ===
2021 Alabama Crimson Tide Football
| Quarterback: 2 – Jalen Milroe – freshman (6'2, 201); 7 – Braxton Barker – (redshirt) junior (6'1, 202); 9 – Bryce Young – sophomore (6'0, 190); 17 – Paul Tyson – (redshirt) sophomore (6'4, 220); 19 – Stone Hollenbach – (redshirt) sophomore (6'3, 208); Running back: 4 – Brian Robinson Jr. – graduate student (6'1, 226); 6 – Trey Sanders – (redshirt) sophomore (6'0, 214); 21 – Jase McClellan – sophomore (5'11, 200); 23 – Roydell Williams – sophomore (5'10, 207); 25 - Camar Wheaton – freshman (5'11, 195); 26 – Jonathan Bennett – sophomore (5'8, 178); 35 – Austin Owens – freshman (6'1, 175); Wide receiver: 1 - Jameson Williams – junior (6'2, 189); 3 – Xavier Williams – (redshirt) junior (6'1, 195); 5 – Javon Baker – sophomore (6'1, 183); 7 – Ja'Corey Brooks – freshman (6'2, 190); 8 – John Metchie III – junior (6'0, 195); 10 – JoJo Earle – freshman (5'9, 170); 11 – Traeshon Holden – sophomore (6'3, 196); 12 – Christian Leary – freshman (5'10, 185); 14 – Thaiu Jones-Bell – sophomore (6'0, 190); 18 – Slade Bolden – (redshirt) junior (5'11, 191); 22 - Chris Herren Jr. – freshman (6'3, 175); 30 - DJ Rias – freshman (5'9, 186); 31 – Shatarius Williams – sophomore (6'3, 187); 36 – Bret Bolin – (redshirt) senior (6'0, 176); 37 – Sam Willoughby – sophomore (5'10, 165); 84 – Agiye Hall – freshman (6'3, 195); 84 – Jacoby Boykins – freshman (5'11, 182); 89 – Grant Krieger – junior (6'2, 192); Placekicker: 16 – Will Reichard – junior (6'1, 180); 82 – Chase Allen – sophomore (6'2, 188); 97 – Reid Schuback – sophomore (6'0, 185); Punter: 86 – James Burnip – (redshirt) freshman (6'6, 216); 95 – Jack Martin – junior (6'2, 222); 98 – Sam Johnson – sophomore (6'3, 215); 99 – Ty Perine – junior (6'1, 190) (PK) | Tight end: 19 – Jahleel Billingsley – junior (6'4, 228); 43 – Robert Ellis – sophomore (6'0, 220); 44 – Charlie Skehan – sophomore (6'1, 232); 45 – Robbie Ouzts – freshman (6'4, 260); 80 – Adam Thorsland – freshman (6'5, 232); 81 – Cameron Latu– (redshirt) junior (6'5, 247); 83 – Richard Hunt – (redshirt) sophomore (6'7, 235); 87 – Caden Clark – freshman (6'4, 258); 88 – Major Tennison – (redshirt) senior (6'5, 248); Offensive lineman: 51 – Tanner Bowles – (redshirt) sophomore (6'5, 280); 55 – Emil Ekiyor Jr. – (redshirt) junior (6'3, 327); 56 – Seth McLaughlin – sophomore (6'4, 278); 58 – James Brockermeyer – freshman (6'3, 270); 60 – Kendall Randolph – (redshirt) senior (6'4, 296); 61 – Graham Roten – freshman (6'3, 285); 62 – Jackson Roby – senior (6'5, 285); 65 – JC Latham – freshman (6'6, 325); 67 – Donovan Hardin – sophomore (6'3, 285); 68 – Alajujuan Sparks Jr. – sophomore (6'4, 385); 69 – Terrance Ferguson II – freshman (6'4, 290); 70 – Javion Cohen – sophomore (6'5, 296); 71 – Darrian Dalcourt – junior (6'3, 299); 72 – Pierce Quick – (redshirt) sophomore (6'5, 291); 73 – Evan Neal – junior (6'7, 360); 74 – Damien George Jr. – sophomore (6'7, 345); 75 – Tommy Brown – (redshirt) junior (6'7, 317); 76 – Tommy Brockermeyer – freshman (6'5, 292); 77 – Jaeden Roberts – freshman (6'5, 345); 78 – Amari Kight – (redshirt) sophomore (6'7, 302); 79 – Chris Owens – graduate student (6'3, 315); Defensive lineman: 18 – LaBryan Ray – (redshirt) senior (6'5, 292); 44 - Damon Payne Jr. – freshman (6'4, 295); 47 – Byron Young – junior (6'3, 295); 48 – Phidarian Mathis – (redshirt) senior (6'4, 312); 50 – Timothy Smith – sophomore (6'4, 315); 52 – Braylen Ingraham – (redshirt) sophomore (6'4, 291); 57 – Chase Quigley – freshman (6'1, 236); 59 – Anquin Barnes – freshman (6'5, 300); 89 – Kyle Mann – sophomore (6'0, 270); 90 – Stephon Wynn Jr. – (redshirt) junior (6'4, 311); 92 – Justin Eboigbe – junior (6'5, 294); 93 – Jah-Marien Latham – sophomore (6'3, 290); 94 – D. J. Dale – junior (6'4, 308); 95 – Monkell Goodwine – freshman (6'4, 278); 96 – Tim Keenan – freshman (6'2, 340); 97 – Keelan Cox – sophomore (6'5, 240); 98 – Jamil Burroughs – sophomore (6'3, 320) | Linebacker: 4 – Christopher Allen – (redshirt) senior (6'5, 250); 8 – Christian Harris – junior (6'2, 244); 10 - Henry To'oTo'o – junior (6'2, 225); 15 - Dallas Turner – freshman (6'4, 230); 19 – Keanu Koht – freshman (6'4, 215); 20 – Drew Sanders – sophomore (6'5, 230); 30 – King Mwikuta – junior (6'5, 238); 31 – Will Anderson Jr. – sophomore (6'4, 220); 32 – Deontae Lawson – freshman (6'2, 217); 33 – Jackson Bratton – sophomore (6'3, 233); 34 – Quandarrius Robinson – sophomore (6'5, 217); 35 – Shane Lee – junior (6'0, 246); 36 – Ian Jackson – freshman (6'1, 225); 37 – Demouy Kennedy – sophomore (6'3, 215); 40 – Kendrick Blackshire – freshman (6'1, 250); 41 – Chris Braswell – sophomore (6'3, 220); 42 – Jaylen Moody – senior (6'2, 228); 43 – Jordan Smith – sophomore (5'10, 210); 54 – Kyle Flood Jr. – sophomore (6'0, 209); 55 – Bennett Whisenhunt – junior (6'1, 222); 56 – Colin Bryant – freshman (6'3, 218); 58 – Christian Johnson – freshman (6'5, 230); Defensive back: 1 – Kool-Aid McKinstry – freshman (6'1, 180); 2 – DeMarcco Hellams – junior (6'1, 213); 3 – Daniel Wright – (redshirt) senior (6'1, 190); 5 – Jalyn Armour-Davis – (redshirt) junior (6'1, 182); 6 – Khyree Jackson – junior (6'4, 205); 9 – Jordan Battle – junior (6'1, 201); 11 – Kristian Story – sophomore (6'2, 198); 12 – Terrion Arnold – freshman (6'1, 185); 13 – Malachi Moore – sophomore (6'0, 175); 14 – Brian Branch – sophomore (6'1, 178); 21 – Brylan Lanier – freshman (6'1, 170); 23 – Jahquez Robinson – sophomore (6'2, 185); 24 – Clark Griffin – sophomore (6'1, 178); 26 – Marcus Banks – junior (6'0, 170); 27 – DeVonta Smith – freshman (5'11, 180); 28 – Josh Jobe – senior (6'1, 189); 29 – Blake Pugh – freshman (6'0, 175); 38 – Jalen Edwards – (redshirt) sophomore (6'0, 177); 39 – Carson Ware – (redshirt) sophomore (6'1, 190); 42 – Sam Reed – junior (6'1, 165); 45 – Joshua Robinson – (redshirt) senior (5'9, 180); 47 – Jacobi McBride – sophomore (6'1, 143); 49 – Kaine Williams– freshman (6'1, 195); Long snappers: 50 – Gabe Pugh – (redshirt) sophomore (6'5, 273); 51 – Kneeland Hibbett – freshman (6'2, 235); 52 – Carter Short – freshman (5'10, 190); 53 – Kade Wehby – freshman (5'9, 195) |
Source and player details, 2021 Alabama Crimson Tide Football Commits (August 28, 2021):

=== Depth chart ===
Defense

FS
DeMarcco Hellams
Brian Branch
Kristian Story

| JACK | WILL | MIKE | SAM |
|---|---|---|---|
| Will Anderson Jr. | Christian Harris | Henry To'oTo'o | Drew Sanders |
| Chris Braswell | Deontae Lawson | Jaylen Moody | ⋅ |
| Dallas Turner | - | Shane Lee | ⋅ |

SS
Jordan Battle
Daniel Wright
-

CB
Josh Jobe
Marcus Banks
Khyree Jackson

| DE | NT | DE |
|---|---|---|
| Justin Eboigbe | D. J. Dale | Bryon Young |
| Phidarian Mathis | Tim Smith | LaBryan Ray |
| Jamil Burroughs | Stephon Wynn Jr. | Jah-Marien Latham |

CB
Jalyn Armour-Davis
Kool-Aid McKinstry
-

Offense

WR
Jameson Williams
Traeshon Holden
Ja'Corey Brooks

WR
Slade Bolden
JoJo Earle
Thaiu Jones-Bell
Christian Leary

| LT | LG | C | RG | RT |
|---|---|---|---|---|
| Evan Neal | Javion Cohen | Chris Owens | Emil Ekiyor Jr. | Kendall Randolph |
| Amari Kight | Tommy Brown | Darrian Dalcourt | Jaeden Roberts | JC Latham |
| - | - | - | Terrance Ferguson II | Damieon George Jr. |

TE
Cameron Latu
Major Tennison
Jahleel Billingsley

WR
John Metchie III
Agiye Hall
Javon Baker

QB
Bryce Young
Paul Tyson
Jalen Milroe

Key reserves
Season-ending injury
Christopher Allen (foot)
Jase McClellan (knee)
Roydell Williams (knee)
Suspension

RB
Brian Robinson Jr.
Trey Sanders
⋅

Special teams
PK Will Reichard
Jack Martin
P James Burnip
Ty Perine
KR Jameson Williams
Jase McClellan
Trey Sanders
Slade Bolden
PR JoJo Earle
Kool-Aid McKinstry
LS Kneeland Hibbett
H Paul Tyson
Bryce Young

True Freshman
Double Position : *

== Spring game ==
The Crimson Tide held spring practices in March and April with the Alabama football spring game, "A-Day", held on April 17. Due to COVID-19 and limited capacity at the stadium, tickets were sold, a change from previous years when fans could attend without paying admission. The announced attendance at the game was 47,218.

== Regular season ==
=== Schedule ===
The 2021 Crimson Tide' schedule consisted of 7 home games, 4 away games, and 1 neutral site game for the regular season. Alabama hosted four SEC conference opponents Arkansas, Ole Miss (rivalry), Tennessee (Third Saturday in October) and rival LSU (rivalry) to close out the SEC regular season at home and travelled to four SEC opponents Florida (rivalry), Mississippi State (rivalry), Texas A&M, and arch-rival Auburn for the 86th Iron Bowl to close out the SEC regular season on the road. Alabama was not scheduled to play SEC East opponents Georgia (rivalry), Kentucky, Missouri, South Carolina, and Vanderbilt in the 2021 regular season. The Crimson Tide's bye week was during week 9 (on October 30, 2021).

Alabama's out-of-conference opponents represented the ACC, C-USA, Independents, and Southern. The Crimson Tide hosted four non–conference games which were against New Mexico State from the FBS independents, Southern Miss from the Conference USA and Mercer from the SoCon to close out the regular season and hosted Miami (FL) (ACC) in Atlanta, GA in the Chick-fil-A Kickoff Game.

| Date | Time | Opponent | Rank | Site | TV | Result | Attendance |
|---|---|---|---|---|---|---|---|
| September 4 | 2:30 p.m. | vs. No. 14 Miami (FL)* | No. 1 | Mercedes-Benz Stadium; Atlanta, GA (Chick-fil-A Kickoff Game / SEC Nation) | ABC | W 44–13 | 71,829 |
| September 11 | 3:00 p.m. | Mercer* | No. 1 | Bryant–Denny Stadium; Tuscaloosa, AL | SECN | W 48–14 | 95,396 |
| September 18 | 2:30 p.m. | at No. 11 Florida | No. 1 | Ben Hill Griffin Stadium; Gainesville, FL (rivalry / SEC Nation) | CBS | W 31–29 | 90,887 |
| September 25 | 6:30 p.m. | Southern Miss* | No. 1 | Bryant–Denny Stadium; Tuscaloosa, AL | SECN | W 63–14 | 100,077 |
| October 2 | 2:30 p.m. | No. 12 Ole Miss | No. 1 | Bryant–Denny Stadium; Tuscaloosa, AL (rivalry / SEC Nation) | CBS | W 42–21 | 100,077 |
| October 9 | 7:00 p.m. | at Texas A&M | No. 1 | Kyle Field; College Station, TX | CBS | L 38–41 | 106,815 |
| October 16 | 6:00 p.m. | at Mississippi State | No. 5 | Davis Wade Stadium; Starkville, MS (rivalry) | ESPN | W 49–9 | 53,796 |
| October 23 | 6:00 p.m. | Tennessee^{†} | No. 4 | Bryant–Denny Stadium; Tuscaloosa, AL (Third Saturday in October) | ESPN | W 52–24 | 100,077 |
| November 6 | 6:00 p.m. | LSU | No. 2 | Bryant–Denny Stadium; Tuscaloosa, AL (rivalry) | ESPN | W 20–14 | 100,077 |
| November 13 | 11:00 a.m. | New Mexico State* | No. 3 | Bryant–Denny Stadium; Tuscaloosa, AL | SECN | W 59–3 | 97,011 |
| November 20 | 2:30 p.m. | No. 21 Arkansas | No. 4 | Bryant–Denny Stadium; Tuscaloosa, AL (SEC Nation) | CBS | W 42–35 | 98,323 |
| November 27 | 2:30 p.m. | at Auburn | No. 3 | Jordan–Hare Stadium; Auburn, AL (Iron Bowl / SEC Nation) | CBS | W 24–22 ^{4OT} | 87,451 |
| December 4 | 3:00 p.m. | vs. No. 1 Georgia | No. 3 | Mercedes-Benz Stadium; Atlanta, GA (SEC Championship Game / rivalry) | CBS | W 41–24 | 78,030 |
| December 31 | 2:30 p.m. | vs. No. 4 Cincinnati* | No. 1 | AT&T Stadium; Arlington, TX (Cotton Bowl Classic – CFP Semifinal / SEC Nation) | ESPN | W 27–6 | 76,313 |
| January 10, 2022 | 7:00 p.m. | vs. No. 3 Georgia | No. 1 | Lucas Oil Stadium; Indianapolis, IN (CFP National Championship / rivalry) | ESPN | L 18–33 | 68,311 |
*Non-conference game; ^{†}Homecoming; Rankings from AP Poll (and CFP Rankings, after November 2) - Released prior to game; All times are in Central time

Schedule source:

=== Game summaries ===
==== Vs. No. 14 Miami ====
No. 1 Alabama Crimson Tide vs. No. 14 Miami Hurricanes

| Quarter | 1 | 2 | 3 | 4 | Total |
|---|---|---|---|---|---|
| No. 1 Crimson Tide | 10 | 17 | 14 | 3 | 44 |
| No. 14 Hurricanes | 0 | 3 | 10 | 0 | 13 |

at Mercedes-Benz Stadium • Atlanta, GA

- Date: September 4
- Game time: 3:30 p.m.
- Game weather: None (retractable roof closed)
- Game attendance: 71,829
- TV announcers (ABC): Sean McDonough (play-by-play), Todd Blackledge (color), Todd McShay and Molly McGrath (sideline)

Game information
First quarter
- ALA – John Metchie III 37-yard pass from Bryce Young (Will Reichard kick), 12:07. Crimson Tide 7–0. Drive: 7 plays, 75 yards, 2:53.
- ALA – Will Reichard 38-yard field goal, 4:39. Crimson Tide 10–0. Drive: 11 plays, 55 yards, 5:05.

Second quarter

- ALA – Cameron Latu 9-yard pass from Bryce Young (Will Reichard kick), 14:12. Crimson Tide 17–0. Drive: 10 plays, 80 yards, 3:32.
- ALA – Will Reichard 51-yard field goal, 11:33. Crimson Tide 20–0. Drive: 4 plays, 0 yards, 2:16.
- ALA – Cameron Latu 25-yard pass from Bryce Young (Will Reichard kick), 6:55. Crimson Tide 27–0. Drive: 7 plays, 74 yards, 2:31.
- MIA – Andres Borregales 37-yard field goal, 0:00. Crimson Tide 27–3. Drive: 11 plays, 60 yards, 1:57.

Third quarter

- ALA – Jameson Williams 94-yard pass from Bryce Young (Will Reichard kick), 9:29. Crimson Tide 34–3. Drive: 3 plays, 99 yards, 0:50.
- ALA – Trey Sanders 20-yard run (Will Reichard kick), 7:01. Crimson Tide 41–3. Drive: 5 plays, 45 yards, 2:16.
- MIA – Xavier Restrepo 29-yard pass from D'Eriq King (Andres Borregales kick), 5:18. Crimson Tide 41–10. Drive: 7 plays, 75 yards, 1:43.
- MIA – Andres Borregales 28-yard field goal, 0:30. Crimson Tide 41–13. Drive: 8 plays, 14 yards, 2:49.

Fourth quarter

- ALA – Will Reichard 40-yard field goal, 7:52. Crimson Tide 44–13. Drive: 13 plays, 53 yards, 7:38.

The Crimson Tide opened the 2021 season at Mercedes-Benz Stadium in Atlanta, Georgia against the No. 14-ranked Miami Hurricanes. It was the programs' first meeting since the Crimson Tide's win over the Hurricanes in the 1993 Sugar Bowl. Alabama entered the contest as a 19.5-point favorite. The Tide's opening drive of 7 plays and 75 yards culminated in a 37-yard touchdown pass from Bryce Young to John Metchie III, giving Alabama a 7–0 lead. Following a punt by Miami, Alabama drove 60 yards in 11 plays for a 38-yard field goal by junior Will Reichard, putting the Tide ahead 10–0. Miami then went three-and-out. At the end of the first quarter, the Tide led 10–0. To begin the second quarter, the Tide offense continued its prowess with a 10-play, 80-yard touchdown drive capped by a Bryce Young pass to Cameron Latu. The Tide led 17–0. Reichard added a 51-yard field goal following a D'Eriq King fumble that was recovered by Phidarian Mathis, making the count 20–0. After a Hurricanes three-and-out, Bryce Young drove the Tide 74 yards, finished off by another touchdown reception by Latu. The score was now 27–0. After trading punts, the 'Canes drove 60 yards in 12 plays for a 37-yard Andres Borregales field goal to cut the deficit to 27–3. The Tide closed the first half with a 27–3 lead.

To open the second half, King led the Canes 74 yards in 14 plays; however, the drive ended in a turnover on downs after King's 4th-and-1 rush was stopped by Henry To'oTo'o and Will Anderson Jr. Shortly thereafter, Bryce Young connected with junior wide receiver Jameson Williams for a 94-yard touchdown, putting Alabama ahead 34–3. On the Canes' next drive, D'Eriq King was intercepted by Malachi Moore. The Tide offense found paydirt following the turnover by means of a 20-yard touchdown run by Trey Sanders. 'Bama now led 41–3. Miami would respond with its first touchdown drive of the game - 75 yards in 7 plays concluding with a 29-yard reception by Xavier Restrepo. The count was now 41–10. The Tide committed its first turnover of the season when Chantz Williams sacked Bryce Young, leading Jordan Miller to recover at the Alabama 25. Miller's recovery would lead to a 28-yard field goal by Borregales to put the 'Canes behind 41–13. The Tide took a 41–13 lead into the fourth quarter, where the only scoring came from a 40-yard Reichard field goal en route to a 44-13 Crimson Tide victory. In his first collegiate start, Young completed 27 of 38 passes for 344 yard and 4 touchdowns. The Crimson Tide earned 510 total yards of offense, including 354 through the air.

| Statistics | Alabama | Miami |
|---|---|---|
| First downs | 28 | 18 |
| Total yards | 501 | 266 |
| Rushing yards | 147 | 88 |
| Passing yards | 354 | 178 |
| Turnovers | 1 | 3 |
| Time of possession | 37:04 | 22:56 |

| Team | Category | Player | Statistics |
|---|---|---|---|
| Alabama | Passing | Bryce Young | 27/38, 344 yards, 4 TD's |
| Alabama | Rushing | Brian Robinson Jr. | 12 carries, 60 yards |
| Alabama | Receiving | Jameson Williams | 4 receptions, 126 yards, 1 TD |
| Miami | Passing | D'Eriq King | 23/31, 178 yards, 1 TD, 2 INT’S |
| Miami | Rushing | Cam’Ron Harris | 12 carries, 38 yards |
| Miami | Receiving | Xavier Restrepo | 3 receptions, 55 yards, 1 TD |

==== Mercer ====
| Team | 1 | 2 | 3 | 4 | Total |
|---|---|---|---|---|---|
| Mercer | 0 | 0 | 7 | 7 | 14 |
| • No. 1 Alabama | 14 | 17 | 14 | 3 | 48 |

- Date: September 11
- Location: Tuscaloosa, AL
- Game start: 3:02 p.m.
- Game attendance: 95,396
- Game weather: 86, Sunny, Wind E @ 6 mph
- Referee: Jason Autrey
- TV announcers (SEC Network): Tom Hart (play-by-play), Jordan Rodgers (color) and Cole Cubelic (sideline)

Alabama returned to Bryant-Denny Stadium for its first home contest of the season against the Mercer Bears of the Southern Conference of FCS. The Tide had won the most recent meeting 56–0 in 2017. In the early part of the first quarter, the teams traded punts until Chris Braswell blocked a punt by Mercer's Trey Turk. Jase McClellan returned the loose football 33 yards for a touchdown to put the Tide ahead 7–0. On the Bears' next series, Carter Peevy's pass was intercepted by Kool-Aid McKinstry at the Alabama 46. The Tide then drove 54 yards, capped by a 4-yard touchdown run by Brian Robinson Jr., to go ahead 14–0. At the end of the first quarter the Tide led 14–0. On the first play of the second quarter, Bryce Young found Slade Bolden for an 18-yard touchdown to make the lead 21–0. Later in the quarter, the Tide took advantage of a short field and drove 29 yards ending in another touchdown by McClellan to make the score 28–0. On Alabama's next drive, Will Reichard converted on a 30-yard field goal, which allowed the Tide to take a 31–0 lead into halftime.

After a Mercer three-and-out, the Tide completed a 5-play, 81-yard drive after Young found Jameson Williams for an 8-yard touchdown. The Tide led 38–0. The Bears responded with a 5-play, 85-yard drive capped by a 60-yard pass from Fred Payton to Devron Harper to cut the deficit to 38–7. Jase McClellan would then account for his third score of the day off a 21-yard touchdown reception from Young, giving the Tide a 45–7 lead. After cornerback Marcus Banks intercepted Fred Payton at the Mercer 47, Paul Tyson took the offense 31 yards in 5 plays. However, Reichard missed on a 34-yard field goal attempt. Going into the fourth quarter the Tide led 45–7. Mercer reached the end zone a second time with 12:30 left after Payton found Ty James for a 22 yards to put the Bears behind 45–14. Quarterback Jalen Milroe the drove the Tide 38 yards in 11 plays for a 40-yard Reichard field goal to make the count 48–14, which was the final score. Bryce Young went 19 for 27 for 227 yards and three touchdowns. The Tide earned 424 total yards of offense, including 266 through the air.

| Statistics | Mercer | Alabama |
|---|---|---|
| First downs | 13 | 24 |
| Total yards | 236 | 425 |
| Rushing yards | 68 | 159 |
| Passing yards | 168 | 266 |
| Turnovers | 2 | 0 |
| Time of possession | 30:14 | 29:46 |

| Team | Category | Player | Statistics |
|---|---|---|---|
| Mercer | Passing | Fred Payton | 9/15, 159 yards, 2 TD's, 1 INT |
| Mercer | Rushing | Fred Davis | 12 carries, 47 yards |
| Mercer | Receiving | Devron Harper | 2 receptions, 69 yards, 1 TD |
| Alabama | Passing | Bryce Young | 19/27, 227 yards, 3 TD's |
| Alabama | Rushing | Brian Robinson Jr. | 10 carries, 70 yards, 1 TD |
| Alabama | Receiving | JoJo Earle | 7 receptions, 85 yards |

==== At No. 11 Florida ====
No. 1 Alabama Crimson Tide at No. 11 Florida Gators – Game summary

| Quarter | 1 | 2 | 3 | 4 | Total |
|---|---|---|---|---|---|
| No. 1 Alabama | 21 | 0 | 7 | 3 | 31 |
| No. 11 Florida | 3 | 6 | 14 | 6 | 29 |

at Ben Hill Griffin Stadium • Gainesville, Florida

- Date: September 18, 2021
- Game time: 3:30 p.m. EDT
- Game weather: Temperature: 87 °F (31 °C) • Wind: E at 3 mph (4.8 km/h) • Weather: Cloudy
- Game attendance: 90,887
- Referee: Alex Moore
- TV announcers (CBS): Brad Nessler (play-by-play), Gary Danielson (color) and Jamie Erdahl (sideline reporter)
- Boxscore

Game information

First quarter

- Alabama – Jase McClellan 7-yard pass from Bryce Young, (Will Reichard kick), 11:21
- Florida – Chris Howard 25-yard field goal, 7:08
- Alabama – Jahleel Billingsley 26-yard pass from Bryce Young, (Will Reichard kick), 4:14
- Alabama – Brian Robinson Jr. 7-yard pass from Bryce Young, (Will Reichard kick), 0:48

Second quarter

- Florida – Malik Davis 26-yard run, 6:34

Third quarter

- Florida – Dameon Pierce 3-yard run, (Chris Howard kick), 10:20
- Alabama – Brian Robinson Jr. 3-yard run, (Will Reichard kick), 4:33
- Florida – Emory Jones 5-yard run, (Chris Howard kick), 00:29

Fourth quarter

- Alabama – Will Reichard 24-yard field goal, 9:30
- Florida – Dameon Pierce 17-yard run, 3:10

Passing leaders

- ALA – Bryce Young – 22/35, 233 yards, 3 touchdowns
- FLA – Emory Jones – 17/27, 181 yards, 1 interception

Rushing leaders

- ALA – Brian Robinson Jr. – 14 carries, 76 yards, 1 touchdown
- FLA – Malik Davis – 10 attempts, 99 yards, 1 touchdown

Receiving leaders

- ALA – Jameson Williams – 4 receptions, 61 yards
- FLA – Keon Zipperer – 4 receptions, 51 yards

Tackling leaders

- ALA – DeMarcco Hellams, 11 tackles
- FLA – Trey Dean III, Gervon Dexter, Mohamoud Diabate, Rashad Torrence – 8 tackles

In a rematch of the 2020 SEC Championship Game, the Crimson Tide traveled to Ben Hill Griffin Stadium for its first SEC matchup of the season. After receiving the opening kickoff, the Tide drove 75 yards in 8 plays after a 7-yard touchdown from Bryce Young to Jase McClellan to go up 7–0. The Gators then drove 75 yards in 11 plays but were forced to settle for a 25-yard field goal by former walk-on kicker Chris Howard, making the count 7–3. The Tide then marched 75 yards in 7 plays, with Young finding tight end Jahleel Billingsley for a 26-yard touchdown. The lead was now 14–3. On the Gators' ensuing drive, Emory Jones was intercepted by Tide cornerback Jalyn Armour-Davis at the Florida 42. The Tide offense utilized the short field as Young connected with Brian Robinson Jr. for a 7-yard touchdown, going up 21–3. The Crimson Tide took a 21–3 lead into the second quarter. Following the Robinson touchdown, the offenses traded punts until Mailk Davis found paydirt on a 26-yard run with 6:34 left in the half. Notably, Chris Howard's extra point was no good, making the score 21–9. The Tide took led 21–9 at the end of the first half.

To begin the second half, Jones led the Gators 75 yards in 10 plays, culminated by a 3-yard touchdown by running back Dameon Pierce, cutting the deficit to 21–16. Young and the Tide offense answered with a 13-play, 74-yard drive cemented by a 3-yard touchdown rush by Robinson to go up 28–16. Helped out by a 30-yard run by Nay'Quan Wright, Emory Jones culminated an 11-play, 99-yard drive with a 5-yard scramble for a touchdown to make the count 28–23. At the end of the third quarter, Alabama led 28–23. Following Jones' rushing touchdown, Young led the Tide to the Florida 1. However, due to a false start penalty by Chris Owens, Alabama was forced to settle for a 23-yard field goal by Will Reichard to make the Tide lead 31–23. Thus, with 9:25 remaining in the game, the Gators still trailed by only one score. Emory Jones and the Gators' offense responded with a 12-play, 75-yard drive that was capped by a 17-yard touchdown run by Dameon Pierce. However, on the ensuing two-point conversion attempt, Malik Davis was tackled short of the goal line, leaving the Gators trailing 31–29. The Tide offense attempted to run out the clock by means of Brian Robinson Jr. and Jase McClellan. Nevertheless, on 4th-and-2 from the Alabama 43, James Burnip punted the ball back to Jones and the Gators. Punt returner Xzavier Henderson fair caught the punt at the Florida 23 with 4 seconds remaining. After dropping back to pass on 1st-and-10, Emory Jones was tackled at the line of scrimmage, allowing the Tide to hang on for a narrow 31–29 win. Bryce Young had yet another impressive performance, completing 22 of 35 passes for 233 yards, 3 touchdowns, and no interceptions. The Tide had 327 total yards of offense.

| Statistics | Alabama | Florida |
|---|---|---|
| First downs | 19 | 26 |
| Total yards | 331 | 440 |
| Rushing yards | 91 | 245 |
| Passing yards | 240 | 195 |
| Turnovers | 0 | 1 |
| Time of possession | 28:10 | 31:50 |

| Team | Category | Player | Statistics |
|---|---|---|---|
| Alabama | Passing | Bryce Young | 22/35, 240 yards, 3 TD's |
| Alabama | Rushing | Brian Robinson Jr. | 15 carries, 78 yards, 1 TD |
| Alabama | Receiving | Jameson Williams | 4 receptions, 61 yards |
| Florida | Passing | Emory Jones | 18/28, 195 yards, 1 INT |
| Florida | Rushing | Malik Davis | 10 carries, 86 yards, 1 TD |
| Florida | Receiving | Keon Zipperer | 4 receptions, 51 yards |

==== Southern Miss ====
| Team | 1 | 2 | 3 | 4 | Total |
|---|---|---|---|---|---|
| Southern Miss | 0 | 7 | 0 | 7 | 14 |
| • No. 1 Alabama | 21 | 21 | 7 | 14 | 63 |

- Date: September 25
- Location: Tuscaloosa, AL
- Game start: 6:39 p.m.
- Game attendance: 100,077
- Game weather: 73, Sunny, Wind N @ 4 mph
- Referee: Lee Hedrick
- TV announcers (SEC Network): Tom Hart (play-by-play), Jordan Rodgers (color) and Cole Cubelic (sideline)

Following a narrow win in Gainesville, the Tide returned to Bryant-Denny Stadium to face the Southern Miss Golden Eagles out of Conference USA. At the start of the first half, Jameson Williams returned Briggs Bourgeois's kickoff 100 yards for a Crimson Tide touchdown and a 7–0 lead. On the Tide's first offensive series, Bryce Young found Jahleel Billingsley for a 16-yard touchdown to go up 14–0. After the Golden Eagles had driven to the Alabama 30, Ty Keyes was intercepted by DeMarcco Hellams. The Tide would proceed to drive 77 yards, culminated in a pass from Bryce Young to Jameson Williams, a fumble by the latter, and a recovery in the end zone by Cameron Latu for a touchdown, giving the Tide a 21–0 lead at the end of the first quarter. Following a 55-yard run by Roydell Williams to the Southern Miss 1, the sophomore running back converted with a 1-yard touchdown to put the Tide up 28–0. On the Tide's next offensive series, Bryce Young found Jameson Williams for an 81-yard touchdown to grab a 35–0 lead. With 5:26 remaining in the first half, Ty Keyes found Chandler Pittman for a 14-yard touchdown, cutting the margin to 35–7. The Tide would wrap up the first half with a 10-play, 97-yard drive capped by a 9-yard touchdown from Young to Jase McClellan. The Tide led 42–7 at the end of the first half.

After an opening three-and-out by the Golden Eagles, Bryce Young found Latu once again, this time from 11 yards out. The Tide led 49–7. On the next offensive series, Young drove the Tide to the Southern Miss 29 before being intercepted by Malik Shorts, his first of the season. Following the series, Bryce Young was finished for the day. The Tide led 49–7 at the end of the third quarter. Coming off Shorts' interception, the Golden Eagles drove 84 yards in 12 plays, capped by a 12-yard touchdown reception by Demarcus Jones. The Tide's lead had been cut to 49–14. On the ensuing kickoff by Bourgeois, Jameson Williams ran 83 yards to the end zone for his second kickoff return for a touchdown of the game, putting the Tide ahead 56–14. The Tide found paydirt again with 2:49 remaining as Jalen Milroe found Javon Baker for a 24-yard touchdown. The Tide won the game 63–14. Bryce Young was 20 of 22 for 313 yards, 4 touchdowns, and an interception. Roydell Williams was the Tide's first 100-yard rusher of the season with 110 yards and a touchdown. Jahleel Billingsley was Alabama's first 100-yard receiver of the season, accounting for 105 yards and a touchdown. Jameson Williams accounted for 3 touchdowns. The Tide had 606 yards of total offense, including 395 yards through the air and 211 on the ground.

| Statistics | USM | Alabama |
|---|---|---|
| First downs | 11 | 22 |
| Total yards | 213 | 606 |
| Rushing yards | 82 | 211 |
| Passing yards | 131 | 395 |
| Turnovers | 1 | 1 |
| Time of possession | 31:18 | 28:42 |

| Team | Category | Player | Statistics |
|---|---|---|---|
| USM | Passing | Ty Keyes | 11/24, 131 yards, 2 TD's, 1 INT |
| USM | Rushing | Ty Keyes | 12 carries, 41 yards |
| USM | Receiving | Grayson Gunter | 3 receptions, 61 yards |
| Alabama | Passing | Bryce Young | 20/22, 313 yards, 5 TD's, 1 INT |
| Alabama | Rushing | Roydell Williams | 11 carries, 110 yards, 1 TD |
| Alabama | Receiving | Jahleel Billingsley | 5 receptions, 105 yards, 1 TD |

==== No. 12 Ole Miss ====
No.12 Ole Miss Rebels (3–0) at No.1 Alabama Crimson Tide (4–0)

| Quarter | 1 | 2 | 3 | 4 | Total |
|---|---|---|---|---|---|
| No. 12 Rebels | 0 | 0 | 7 | 14 | 21 |
| No. 1 Crimson Tide | 7 | 21 | 7 | 7 | 42 |

at Bryant–Denny Stadium • Tuscaloosa, AL

- Game time: 2:30 p.m. CDT
- TV announcers (CBS): Brad Nessler (play-by-play), Gary Danielson (analyst) and Jamie Erdahl (sideline)

Game information

First Quarter

- (2:20) ALA – John Metchie III 16 yard pass from Bryce Young, Will Reichard kick
  Alabama 7–0; 13 plays, 94 yards, 6:31

Second Quarter

- (12:14) ALA – Brian Robinson Jr. 1 yard rush, Will Reichard kick
  Alabama 14–0; 10 plays, 47 yards, 3:28
- (2:55) ALA – Cameron Latu 3 yard pass from Bryce Young, Will Reichard kick
  Alabama 21–0; 6 plays, 27 yards, 3:04
- (0:57) ALA – Brian Robinson Jr. 1 yard rush, Will Reichard kick
  Alabama 28–0; 4 plays, 14 yards, 1:42

Third Quarter

- (12:32) ALA – Brian Robinson Jr. 1 yard rush, Will Reichard kick
  Alabama 35–0; 6 plays, 77 yards, 2:28
- (8:25) MISS – Matt Corral 10 yard rush, Caden Costa kick
  Alabama 35–7; 10 plays, 75 yards, 4:07

Fourth Quarter

- (10:47) ALA – Brian Robinson Jr. 2 yard rush, Will Reichard kick
  Alabama 42–7; 9 plays, 66 yards, 4:49
- (8:43) MISS – Snoop Conner 1 yard rush, Caden Costa kick
  Alabama 42–14; 7 plays, 70 yards, 2:04
- (2:23) MISS – Chase Rogers 2 yard pass from Matt Corral, Caden Costa kick
  Alabama 42–21; 9 plays, 50 yards, 1:54

For the first home SEC contest of the season, Ole Miss head coach Lane Kiffin, who was offensive coordinator under Saban's Tide from 2014 to 2016, returned to Bryant-Denny Stadium. The Rebels received the opening kickoff and drove to the Alabama 6. However, a 4th-and-1 rush by Jerrion Ealy came up short of the line-to-gain. The Crimson Tide offense answered by driving 94 yards in 13 plays. Bryce Young completed a 16-yard touchdown pass to John Metchie III to put Alabama ahead 7–0. On the Rebels' second drive, Kiffin elected to attempt another fourth-down conversion. Matt Corral failed to connect with Braylon Sanders, allowing Alabama to take over in Ole Miss territory. At the end of the first quarter Alabama led 7–0. With 12:14 left in the half, Brian Robinson Jr. scored on a 1-yard run to put the Tide ahead 14–0. Ole Miss's next drive stalled and resulted in a Mac Brown punt. Alabama's next drive stalled as well. On their next drive, the Rebels offense attempted their third 4th-down conversion of the first half. On 4th-and-1 from the Rebels' own 31, Jerrion Ealy was stopped by the Tide defense for a 4-yard loss. Alabama's offense reached paydirt 6 plays later, with Bryce Young connecting with Cameron Latu for a 3-yard touchdown; Alabama led 21–0. On the Rebels' next offensive play, Phidarian Mathis sacked Matt Corral and forced the quarterback to fumble. Defensive end Justin Eboigbe recovered the fumble at the Ole Miss 14. 4 plays later, Robinson scored his second touchdown of the game off a 1-yard run. The Tide led 28–0, and it took that lead into the locker room.

To begin the second half, the Tide offense drove 77 yards in 6 plays. Brian Robinson scored another 1-yard touchdown, his third score of the game. The Tide led 35–0. Ole Miss responded with an 11-play, 75-yard drive, culminating with a 10-yard touchdown run by Corral. The Tide lead was now 35–7. On its following series, the Tide offense drove to the Ole Miss 15. However, Ole Miss regained possession after Bryce Young was picked off by Keidron Smith. The Rebels went three-and-out after the interception. At the end of the third quarter, Alabama led 35–7. The Tide then drove 66 yards in 9 plays as Brian Robinson scored his fourth touchdown of the day from 2 yards out. The Tide lead was now 42–7 with 10:47 remaining. The Rebels' offense then drove 85 yards in 7 plays; Snoop Conner scored from 1 yard out. The 'Bama lead was reduced to 42–14. After Brian Robinson failed to convert on a 4th-and-1 from midfield, Ole Miss regained possession with 4:17 to go. The Rebels drove 50 yards in 10 plays as Corral connected with tight end Chase Rogers for a 2-yard touchdown. The Tide lead was now 42–21. The Tide got the ball back and ran out the clock. The final score was 42–21. Matt Corral completed 21 of 29 passes for 213 yards and a touchdown. Bryce Young went 20 of 26 for 241 yards, 2 touchdowns, and an interception. Brian Robinson Jr. ran for 171 yards on 36 carries, earning 4 touchdowns along the way. The Crimson Tide offense compiled 451 total yards, including 210 on the ground.

| Statistics | Ole Miss | Alabama |
|---|---|---|
| First downs | 18 | 27 |
| Total yards | 291 | 451 |
| Rushing yards | 78 | 210 |
| Passing yards | 213 | 241 |
| Turnovers | 1 | 1 |
| Time of possession | 22:01 | 37:59 |

| Team | Category | Player | Statistics |
|---|---|---|---|
| Ole Miss | Passing | Matt Corral | 21/29, 213 yards, 1 TD |
| Ole Miss | Rushing | Henry Parrish | 11 carries, 47 yards |
| Ole Miss | Receiving | Chase Rogers | 3 receptions, 53 yards, 1 TD |
| Alabama | Passing | Bryce Young | 20/26, 241 yards, 2 TD's, 1 INT |
| Alabama | Rushing | Brian Robinson Jr. | 36 carries, 171 yards, 4 TD's |
| Alabama | Receiving | Jameson Williams | 5 receptions, 65 yards |

==== At Texas A&M ====
No. 1 Alabama Crimson Tide at Texas A&M Aggies – Game summary

| Quarter | 1 | 2 | 3 | 4 | Total |
|---|---|---|---|---|---|
| No. 1 Crimson Tide | 7 | 3 | 14 | 14 | 38 |
| Aggies | 17 | 7 | 7 | 10 | 41 |

at Kyle Field, College Station, Texas

- Date: October 9
- Game time: 7:00 p.m.
- Game weather: Sunny
- Game attendance: 106,815
- Referee: Jason Autrey
- TV announcers (CBS): Brad Nessler (play-by-play), Gary Danielson (analyst) and Jamie Erdahl (sideline)
- Box score, Recap

Game information
First quarter
- TAMU – Seth Small 38-yard field goal, 11:35. Aggies 3–0. Drive: 7 plays, 54 yards, 3:25.
- ALA – Roydell Williams 20-yard pass from Bryce Young (Will Reichard kick), 6:42. Crimson Tide 7–3. Drive: 10 plays, 65 yards, 4:53.
- TAMU – Jalen Wydermyer 27-yard pass from Zach Calzada (Seth Small kick), 5:26. Aggies 10–7. Drive: 3 plays, 75 yards, 1:16.
- TAMU – Ainias Smith 6-yard pass from Zach Calzada (Seth Small kick), 0:33. Aggies 17–7. Drive: 7 plays, 41 yards, 3:44.

Second quarter

- ALA – Will Reichard 38-yard field goal, 5:44. Aggies 17–10. Drive: 5 plays, 20 yards, 1:25.
- TAMU – Isaiah Spiller 15-yard run (Seth Small kick), 2:09. Aggies 24–10. Drive: 7 plays, 75 yards, 3:35.

Third quarter

- ALA – King Mwikuta 0-yard blocked punt return (Will Reichard kick), 8:18. Aggies 24–17.
- TAMU – De’Von Achane 96-yard kickoff return (Seth Small kick), 8:00. Aggies 31–17.
- ALA – Jameson Williams 29-yard pass from Bryce Young (Will Reichard kick), 5:30. Aggies 31–24. Drive: 6 plays, 75 yards, 2:34.

Fourth quarter

- ALA – Will Reichard 26-yard field goal, 14:04. Aggies 31–27. Drive: 9 plays, 48 yards, 4:50.
- ALA – Will Reichard 22-yard field goal, 8:44. Aggies 31–30. Drive: 13 plays, 64 yards, 4:18.
- ALA – Jameson Williams 7-yard pass from Bryce Young (Bryce Young pass to Jameson Williams), 5:00. Crimson Tide 38–31. Drive: 9 plays, 82 yards, 2:52.
- TAMU – Ainias Smith 25-yard pass from Zach Calzada (Seth Small kick), 3:00. Tied 38–38. Drive: 6 plays, 65 yards, 2:00.
- TAMU – Seth Small 28-yard field goal, 0:00. Aggies 41–38. Drive: 8 plays, 54 yards, 2:08.

For its third SEC contest of the season, the Tide traveled to Kyle Field to face the Texas A&M Aggies. After receiving the opening kickoff, the Aggies drove to the Alabama 21 but had to settle for a 38-yard field goal by Seth Small, putting A&M ahead 3–0. The Tide offense responded with a 20-yard touchdown from Bryce Young to Roydell Williams, making the score 7-3 Alabama. A&M found the end zone three plays later as Zach Calzada connected with Jalen Wydermyer for a 27-yard touchdown. A&M now lead 10–7. After Brian Robinson Jr. fumbled at the Alabama 45, Calzada found Ainias Smith for a 6-yard touchdown to give the Aggies a 17–7 lead. At the end of the first quarter Texas A&M led 17–7. Early in the second quarter the Tide had a 3rd-and-goal at the A&M 1. However, Young was intercepted by Demani Richardson. Later in the quarter Calzada was picked off by DeMarcco Hellams, leading to a 38-yard field goal by Will Reichard. The Tide now trailed 17–10. Following the field goal, the Aggies drove 75 yards in 7 plays, culminating in a 15-yard touchdown run by Isaiah Spiller. The Aggies would take a 24–10 lead into the locker room.

To open the second half the Tide offense reached the Texas A&M 31, but the drive stalled and ended with a James Burnip punt. However Alabama's special teams came through on the next series when Ja'Corey Brooks blocked Nik Constantinou's punt deep in Aggie territory. Junior linebacker King Mwikuta recovered the ball in the end zone for a touchdown, cutting the deficit to 24–17. The Aggies' special teams had an answer of their own as De’Von Achane returned the ensuing kickoff 96 yards for a touchdown, putting the Aggies ahead 31–17. The Tide offense found the end zone six plays later when Young found Jameson Williams for a 29-yard touchdown. The Aggies' lead was now 31–24. After the defense got a stop, the Tide got the ball back at the Alabama 43. The Aggies took a 31–24 lead into the fourth quarter. After failing to convert on a 3rd-and-13 from the A&M 20, the Tide had to settle for a 26-yard Reichard field goal. The Aggies' lead was now 31–27. After earning another defensive stop, the Tide offense once again drove deep into A&M territory. After having a 1st-and-goal from the 3, however, 'Bama had to settle for a 22-yard field goal, cutting the deficit to 31–30. After the Aggies' offense went three-and-out, Young led the Tide offense 82 yards in 9 plays, connecting with Jameson Williams for a 7-yard touchdown. Young connected with Williams again on the ensuing two-point conversion, putting the Tide ahead 38–31, the team's first lead since the first quarter. Six plays later Calzada connected again with Ainias Smith for a 25-yard score, tying the game 38-38. Alabama took possession at its own 25 with 2:54 remaining but punted three plays later. Calzada then led the Aggies 54 yards in 8 plays, leading to a 28-yard Seth Small field goal as time expired. The Aggies won the game 41–38, their first win over the Tide since the 2012 season.

| Statistics | Alabama | Texas A&M |
|---|---|---|
| First downs | 25 | 24 |
| Total yards | 522 | 379 |
| Rushing yards | 153 | 94 |
| Passing yards | 369 | 285 |
| Turnovers | 2 | 1 |
| Time of possession | 33:38 | 26:13 |

| Team | Category | Player | Statistics |
|---|---|---|---|
| Alabama | Passing | Bryce Young | 28/48, 369 yards, 3 TD's, 1 INT |
| Alabama | Rushing | Brian Robinson Jr. | 24 carries, 147 yards |
| Alabama | Receiving | Jameson Williams | 10 receptions, 146 yards, 2 TD's |
| Texas A&M | Passing | Zach Calzada | 21/31, 285 yards, 3 TD's, 1 INT |
| Texas A&M | Rushing | Isaiah Spiller | 17 carries, 46 yards, 1 TD |
| Texas A&M | Receiving | Ainias Smith | 6 receptions, 85 yards, 2 TD's |

==== At Mississippi State ====
| Team | 1 | 2 | 3 | 4 | Total |
|---|---|---|---|---|---|
| • No. 5 Alabama | 14 | 7 | 14 | 14 | 49 |
| Mississippi State | 3 | 3 | 3 | 0 | 9 |

- Date: October 16
- Location: Starkville, MS
- Game start: 6:11 p.m.
- Game attendance: 53,796
- Game weather: 63, Sunny, Wind N @ 7 mph
- Referee: Matt Loeffler
- TV announcers (ESPN): Joe Tessitore (play-by-play), Greg McElroy (color), Katie George (sideline)

After falling to Texas A&M in College Station, the Tide went on the road for the second week in a row against the Mississippi State Bulldogs. On the Bulldogs' opening series quarterback Will Rogers was intercepted by Josh Jobe. Six plays later Bryce Young found John Metchie III for a 46-yard touchdown to put the Tide ahead 7–0. The Bulldogs responded with a 44-yard Brandon Ruiz field goal to make the count 7–3. On State's next series Rogers was intercepted again by Jordan Battle, who returned it 40 yards for a Crimson Tide touchdown, putting the Tide ahead 14–3. The Tide led 14–3 at the end of the first quarter. After getting the ball at their own 7 with 10:25 left in the half, Bryce Young led the Tide 93 yards to paydirt after Brian Robinson Jr. scored from 1 yard out. With 3:15 remaining the Tide led 21–3. The Bulldogs responded by driving to the Alabama 10, but they were forced to settle for a 37-yard field goal by Ruiz, cutting the deficit to 21–6. The Tide took a 21–6 lead into the locker room.

On the first offensive play of the second half, Bryce Young connected with Jameson Williams for a 75-yard touchdown. The Tide lead was extended to 28–6. State responded by driving to the Alabama 8. However, after a sack by Will Anderson Jr., the Bulldogs had to settle for another Ruiz field goal. With 10:40 remaining State trailed 28–9. After trading punts, Young led the Tide offense 84 yards in 7 plays, connecting with Robinson for a 51-yard touchdown, putting 'Bama ahead 35–9. Heading into the fourth quarter, the score remained 35–9. On Alabama's next drive, Robinson found the end zone again, this time from 3 yards out. The Tide lead was 42–9 with 12:37 left. On its next series, Young found sophomore wideout Traeshon Holden for a 29-yard touchdown to put 'Bama ahead 49–9. On State's ensuing possession, Jordan Battle obtained his second interception of the day. The Crimson Tide ran out the clock to win 49–9. Bryce Young completed 20 of 28 passes for 348 yard and 4 touchdowns, and the Tide offense outgained the Bulldogs 543–299.

| Statistics | Alabama | Miss State |
|---|---|---|
| First downs | 22 | 24 |
| Total yards | 543 | 299 |
| Rushing yards | 195 | -1 |
| Passing yards | 348 | 300 |
| Turnovers | 0 | 3 |
| Time of possession | 29:53 | 30:07 |

| Team | Category | Player | Statistics |
|---|---|---|---|
| Alabama | Passing | Bryce Young | 20/28, 348 yards, 4 TD's |
| Alabama | Rushing | Roydell Williams | 11 carries, 78 yards |
| Alabama | Receiving | John Metchie III | 7 receptions, 117 yards, 1 TD |
| Miss State | Passing | Will Rogers | 35/55, 300 yards, 3 INT's |
| Miss State | Rushing | Dillon Johnson | 7 carries, 24 yards |
| Miss State | Receiving | Jaden Walley | 6 receptions, 64 yards |

==== Tennessee ====
Third Saturday in October

| Team | 1 | 2 | 3 | 4 | Total |
|---|---|---|---|---|---|
| Tennessee | 14 | 0 | 3 | 7 | 24 |
| • No. 4 Alabama | 7 | 14 | 3 | 28 | 52 |

- Date: October 23
- Location: Tuscaloosa, AL
- Game start: 6:05 p.m.
- Game attendance: 100,077
- Game weather: 72, Sunny, Wind S @ 2 mph
- Referee: Alex Moore
- TV announcers (ESPN): Jason Benetti (play-by-play), Greg McElroy (color), Katie George (sideline)

After a convincing win in Starkville, the Tide returned to Tuscaloosa to face its longtime rival, the Tennessee Volunteers. Alabama had won the previous fourteen meetings. After a Tennessee three-and-out, the Tide offense drove 85 yards in 12 plays as Brian Robinson Jr. scored from 8 yards out. The Tide led 7–0 with 8:05 to go. Hendon Hooker then took the Vols 75 yards in 8 plays, connecting with Velus Jones Jr. for an 8-yard touchdown. With 6:15 remaining the score was tied 7-7. On its next series Alabama drove to the Tennessee 33, but Will Reichard failed to convert on a 54-yard field goal. Hooker then connected with JaVonta Payton for a 57-yard touchdown, putting the Vols ahead 14–7 with 26 seconds remaining in the quarter. On its ensuing series Alabama quickly drove into Volunteer territory. On 1st-and-10 from the Vols 25, Young hit Jameson Williams at the 9. Cornerback Kamal Hadden then forced Williams to fumble, and Kenneth George Jr. recovered with 14:13 to go. After a punt by Paxton Brooks, the Tide took over at the Tennessee 44. Seven plays later, Bryce Young found the end zone on a 5-yard touchdown run. With 9:27 to go the score was tied 14-14. After a Vols three-and-out, the Tide drove 79 yards in 12 plays as Young found John Metchie III for a 6-yard touchdown. With 2:34 to go, the Tide led 21–14. The Tide took a 21–14 lead into halftime.

Early in the third quarter, the Vols' De'Shawn Rucker blocked a punt by James Burnip, giving Tennessee the ball at the Alabama 16. The Tide defense held the Vols to a 32-yard Chase McGrath field goal. With 9:44 to go the score was 21–17. Alabama drove to the Tennessee 28 on its next possession but had to settle for a 45-yard field goal by Will Reichard. The Tide lead was 24–17 with 6:22 remaining in the quarter. On the Tide's next possession, Young led the offense 80 yards in 11 plays as the quarterback scored his second rushing touchdown of the day. With 14:51 remaining in the game Alabama's lead was 31–17. The Vols responded with a 70-yard touchdown pass from Hooker to Cedric Tillman, cutting the deficit to 31–24. After a 65-yard reception by Jameson Williams, Brian Robinson Jr. scored from 15 yards out. With 12:42 left the Tide led 38–24. On the Vols next offensive series, after driving to the Alabama 43, Hooker was picked off by Jalyn Armour-Davis. Armour-Davis returned the interception 47 yards. From there the Tide extended its lead to 45–24 with a 1-yard touchdown by Robinson. After the Vols failed to convert a 4th-and-6 from their own 29, Young found Metchie for a 19-yard score. With 5:01 remaining the Tide led 52–24, and it would go on to win the game by that score. It was Alabama's 15th consecutive victory over the Volunteers, a series record.

| Statistics | Tennessee | Alabama |
|---|---|---|
| First downs | 10 | 32 |
| Total yards | 346 | 574 |
| Rushing yards | 64 | 203 |
| Passing yards | 282 | 371 |
| Turnovers | 1 | 1 |
| Time of possession | 19:34 | 40:26 |

| Team | Category | Player | Statistics |
|---|---|---|---|
| Tennessee | Passing | Hendon Hooker | 19/28, 282 yards, 3 TD's, 1 INT |
| Tennessee | Rushing | Tiyon Evans | 7 carries, 30 yards |
| Tennessee | Receiving | Cedric Tillman | 7 receptions, 152 yards, 1 TD |
| Alabama | Passing | Bryce Young | 31/43, 371 yards, 2 TD's |
| Alabama | Rushing | Brian Robinson Jr. | 26 carries, 107 yards, 3 TD's |
| Alabama | Receiving | Jameson Williams | 6 receptions, 123 yards |

==== LSU ====
| Team | 1 | 2 | 3 | 4 | Total |
|---|---|---|---|---|---|
| LSU | 7 | 0 | 7 | 0 | 14 |
| • No. 2 Alabama | 0 | 14 | 6 | 0 | 20 |

- Date: November 6
- Location: Tuscaloosa, AL
- Game start: 6:05 p.m.
- Game attendance: 100,077
- Game weather: 55, Sunny, Wind N @ 7 mph
- Referee: Matt Loeffler
- TV announcers (ESPN): Chris Fowler (play-by-play), Kirk Herbstreit (color), Holly Rowe (sideline)

After a bye week, the No. 3-ranked Crimson Tide hosted the LSU Tigers at Bryant-Denny Stadium, facing the Tigers' lame-duck head coach Ed Orgeron. It was a rematch of the Game of the Century between the rivals two years prior. After receiving the opening kickoff, the Tide offense drove to the LSU 32. However, placekicker Will Reichard missed a 49-yard field goal. LSU responded with by driving 68 yards in 8 plays for a touchdown as Max Johnson connected with Brian Thomas Jr. With 8:33 left in the opening quarter, the Tigers led 7–0. After the two teams traded punts, the Tide drove to the LSU 33. However, a delay of game penalty, sack, and illegal formation penalty led to a 4th-and-31 and a James Burnip punt. On its next series, Alabama drove to the LSU 39 but turned the ball over on downs after Bryce Young failed to connect with John Metchie III on 4th-and-2. The Tigers took over with 11:45 remaining in the half but punted six plays later. Young then led the Tide offense 77 yards in 12 plays, capped by a 2-yard touchdown run by Brian Robinson Jr. With 2:52 left in the half the score was tied 7-7. On the Tigers' ensuing series, Max Johnson was picked off by Jalyn Armour-Davis, allowing the Tide to take over at the LSU 39. On 3rd-and-goal at the 8, Young connected with Metchie for an 8-yard touchdown, giving the Tide a 14–7 lead with 48 seconds remaining in the half. After Max Johnson was sacked by Will Anderson Jr., the teams went into halftime with the Tide ahead 14–7.

On LSU's opening possession of the second half, Phidarian Mathis recovered a fumble by running back Tyrion Davis-Price. Alabama took over at its own 42. Two plays later Young found Jameson Williams for a 58-yard touchdown. Reichard's PAT was no good, so with 12:51 remaining in the third the Tide's lead was 20–7. After the two teams traded punts, Johnson took the Tigers offense 89 yards in 14 plays as he connected with tight end Jack Bech for an 8-yard touchdown. With 2:27 remaining in the third, 'Bama's lead was cut to 20–14. The Tide went three-and-out on their next series. After a 37-yard run by Davis-Price, LSU had 1st-and-goal at the Alabama 8. On 4th-and-goal from the 7, the 'Bama defense held as Johnson failed to connect with Trey Palmer. The Tide took over and continued to chew clock. On 3rd-and-5 from the LSU 46, safety Cameron Lewis sacked Bryce Young. Young fumbled the ball, which was recovered by defensive tackle Jaquelin Roy at the Alabama 42. With 2:36 remaining, the Tigers had a 4th-and-9 from the 41. The Tide defense held its own again as Johnson could not connect with Bech. Even after LSU used its final timeout, the Tide could not run out the game clock. After a 31-yard punt by Burnip, the Tigers took over at their own 38. On 4th-and-9, Johnson connected with Thomas for a first down at the Alabama 45. Johnson then found Jaray Jenkins at the 30. Jenkins went out of bounds with 5 seconds remaining. On the final play of the game, Max Johnson's pass to the end zone fell incomplete. The Tide held on to win 20–14.

| Statistics | LSU | Alabama |
|---|---|---|
| First downs | 16 | 16 |
| Total yards | 295 | 308 |
| Rushing yards | 109 | 6 |
| Passing yards | 186 | 302 |
| Turnovers | 2 | 1 |
| Time of possession | 31:16 | 28:44 |

| Team | Category | Player | Statistics |
|---|---|---|---|
| LSU | Passing | Max Johnson | 16/32, 160 yards, 2 TD's, 1 INT |
| LSU | Rushing | Tyrion Davis-Price | 23 carries, 104 yards |
| LSU | Receiving | Jaray Jenkins | 4 receptions, 54 yards |
| Alabama | Passing | Bryce Young | 24/37, 302 yards, 2 TD's |
| Alabama | Rushing | Brian Robinson Jr. | 13 carries, 18 yards, 1 TD |
| Alabama | Receiving | Jameson Williams | 10 receptions, 160 yards, 1 TD |

==== New Mexico State ====
| Team | 1 | 2 | 3 | 4 | Total |
|---|---|---|---|---|---|
| New Mexico St | 3 | 0 | 0 | 0 | 3 |
| • No. 2 Alabama | 14 | 35 | 0 | 10 | 59 |

- Date: November 13
- Location: Tuscaloosa, AL
- Game start: 11:03 a.m.
- Game attendance: 97,011
- Game weather: 48, Sunny, Wind N @ 10 mph
- Referee: Marc Curles
- TV announcers (SEC Network): Taylor Zarzour (play-by-play), Matt Stinchcomb (color), Alyssa Lang (sideline)

| Statistics | New Mexico St | Alabama |
|---|---|---|
| First downs | 10 | 30 |
| Total yards | 138 | 587 |
| Rushing yards | 9 | 247 |
| Passing yards | 129 | 340 |
| Turnovers | 1 | 1 |
| Time of possession | 29:27 | 30:33 |

| Team | Category | Player | Statistics |
|---|---|---|---|
| New Mexico St | Passing | Jonah Johnson | 19/30, 129 yards |
| New Mexico St | Rushing | Jonah Johnson | 14 carries, 5 yards |
| New Mexico St | Receiving | Cole Harrity | 3 receptions, 30 yards |
| Alabama | Passing | Bryce Young | 21/23, 270 yards, 5 TD's |
| Alabama | Rushing | Brian Robinson Jr. | 9 carries, 99 yards, 2 TD's |
| Alabama | Receiving | Jameson Williams | 6 receptions, 158 yards, 3 TD's |

==== No. 21 Arkansas ====
Game Eleven – No. 21 Arkansas Razorbacks (7–3) at No. 2 Alabama Crimson Tide (9–1)

| Quarter | 1 | 2 | 3 | 4 | Total |
|---|---|---|---|---|---|
| No. 21 Razorbacks | 0 | 14 | 7 | 14 | 35 |
| No. 2 Crimson Tide | 3 | 21 | 10 | 8 | 42 |

at Bryant–Denny Stadium • Tuscaloosa, Alabama

- Date: November 20, 2021
- Game time: 2:30 p.m. CST
- Game weather: Fair • Temperature: 64 °F (18 °C) • Wind: NW 1 mph
- Referee: Lee Hedrick
- TV announcers (CBS): Brad Nessler (play-by-play), Gary Danielson (analyst), Jamie Erdahl (sideline)
- Game summary: ESPN

Game information

First quarter

- (7:41) Alabama – Will Reichard 48 yard field goal (Drive: 4 plays, 2 yards, 0:46; Alabama 3–0)

Second quarter

- (14:54) Alabama – John Metchie III 20 yard pass from Bryce Young, Will Reichard kick (Drive: 9 plays, 98 yards, 3:36; Alabama 10–0)
- (6:06) Arkansas – Treylon Burks 21 yard pass from KJ Jefferson, Cam Little kick (Drive: 13 plays, 96 yards, 5:05; Alabama 10–7)
- (5:21) Alabama – Jameson Williams 79 yard pass from Bryce Young, Will Reichard kick (Drive: 2 plays, 75 yards, 0:45; Alabama 17–7)
- (3:40) Arkansas – Dominique Johnson 1 yard rush, Cam Little kick (Drive: 7 plays, 75 yards, 2:09; Alabama 17–14)
- (1:44) Alabama – Jameson Williams 32 yard pass from Bryce Young, Will Reichard kick (Drive: 6 plays, 75 yards, 1:56; Alabama 24–14)

Third quarter

- (11:31) Alabama – Christian Leary 11 yard pass from Bryce Young, Will Reichard kick (Drive: 9 plays, 75 yards, 3:29; Alabama 31–14)
- (10:09) Arkansas – Treylon Burks 66 yard pass from KJ Jefferson, Cam Little kick (Drive: 3 plays, 75 yards, 1:22; Alabama 31–21)
- (1:09) Alabama – Will Reichard 30 yard field goal (Drive: 9 plays, 63 yards, 3:06; Alabama 34–21)

Fourth quarter

- (11:24) Arkansas – Blake Kern 32 yard pass from Reid Bauer, Cam Little kick (Drive: 10 plays, 75 yards, 4:45; Alabama 34–28)
- (5:39) Alabama – Jameson Williams 40 yard pass from Bryce Young, 2-point rush good (Drive: 4 plays, 55 yards, 1:51; Alabama 42–28)
- (1:02) Arkansas – Raheim Sanders 17 yard pass from KJ Jefferson, Cam Little kick (Drive: 12 plays, 75 yards, 4:37; Alabama 42–35)

| Statistics | Arkansas | Alabama |
|---|---|---|
| First downs | 21 | 29 |
| Total yards | 468 | 671 |
| Rushing yards | 110 | 112 |
| Passing yards | 358 | 559 |
| Turnovers | 1 | 1 |
| Time of possession | 29:30 | 30:30 |

| Team | Category | Player | Statistics |
|---|---|---|---|
| Arkansas | Passing | KJ Jefferson | 22/30, 326 yards, 3 TD's |
| Arkansas | Rushing | Trelon Smith | 9 carries, 42 yards |
| Arkansas | Receiving | Treylon Burks | 8 receptions, 179 yards, 2 TD's |
| Alabama | Passing | Bryce Young | 31/40, 559 yards, 5 TD's |
| Alabama | Rushing | Brian Robinson Jr. | 27 carries, 122 yards |
| Alabama | Receiving | Jameson Williams | 8 receptions, 190 yards, 3 TD's |

==== At Auburn ====
Game Twelve – No. 3 Alabama Crimson Tide (10-1) at Auburn Tigers (6-5)

| Quarter | 1 | 2 | 3 | 4 | OT | 2OT | 3OT | 4OT | Total |
|---|---|---|---|---|---|---|---|---|---|
| No. 3 Crimson Tide | 0 | 0 | 0 | 10 | 7 | 3 | 2 | 2 | 24 |
| Tigers | 0 | 7 | 3 | 0 | 7 | 3 | 2 | 0 | 22 |

at Jordan–Hare Stadium • Auburn, Alabama

- Date: November 27, 2021
- Game time: 2:39 p.m. CST
- Game weather: Sunny • Temperature: 63 °F (17 °C) • Wind: SW 4 mph
- Game attendance: 87,451
- Referee: Alex Moore
- TV announcers (CBS): Brad Nessler (play-by-play), Gary Danielson (analyst), Jamie Erdahl (sideline reporter)
- Box Score

| Statistics | Alabama | Auburn |
|---|---|---|
| First downs | 18 | 11 |
| Total yards | 388 | 159 |
| Rushing yards | 71 | 22 |
| Passing yards | 317 | 137 |
| Turnovers | 1 | 1 |
| Time of possession | 29:24 | 30:36 |

| Team | Category | Player | Statistics |
|---|---|---|---|
| Alabama | Passing | Bryce Young | 25/51, 317 yards, 2 TDs, 1 INT |
| Alabama | Rushing | Brian Robinson Jr. | 16 carries, 71 yards |
| Alabama | Receiving | John Metchie III | 13 receptions, 150 yards |
| Auburn | Passing | T. J. Finley | 17/26, 137 yards, 2 TDs, 1 INT |
| Auburn | Rushing | Tank Bigsby | 29 carries, 63 yards |
| Auburn | Receiving | Demetris Robertson | 3 receptions, 39 yards |

==== Vs. No. 1 Georgia ====
SEC Championship Game

| Quarter | 1 | 2 | 3 | 4 | Total |
|---|---|---|---|---|---|
| No. 1 Georgia | 3 | 14 | 0 | 7 | 24 |
| No. 3 Alabama | 0 | 24 | 7 | 10 | 41 |

at Mercedes-Benz Stadium • Atlanta, Georgia

- Date: December 4, 2021
- Game time: 4:00 p.m. EST
- Game weather: Indoors
- Referee: Ken Williamson
- TV announcers (CBS): Brad Nessler (play-by-play), Gary Danielson (color), Jamie Erdahl (sideline)
- Game summary: -->

Game information

First quarter

- (6:01) UGA – Jack Podlesny 38 yd Field Goal (Georgia 3–0)

Second quarter

- (14:56) UGA – Darnell Washington 5 yd pass from Stetson Bennett (Jack Podlesny Kick) (Georgia 10–0)
- (14:12) ALA – Jameson Williams 67 yd pass from Bryce Young (Will Reichard Kick) (Georgia 10–7)
- (9:46) ALA – John Metchie III 13 yd pass from Bryce Young (Will Reichard Kick) (Alabama 14–10)
- (3:28) ALA – Will Reichard 33 yd Field Goal (Alabama 17–10)
- (2:06) UGA – Ladd McConkey 32 yd pass from Stetson Bennett (Jack Podlesny Kick) (Tied 17–17)
- (0:26) ALA – Bryce Young 11 yd rush (Will Reichard Kick) (Alabama 24–17)

Third quarter

- (13:10) ALA – Jameson Williams 55 yd pass from Bryce Young (Will Reichard Kick) (Alabama 31–17)

Fourth quarter

- (11:59) ALA – Stetson Bennett pass intercepted by Jordan Battle for a 42 yd TD return (Will Reichard KICK) (Alabama 38–17)
- (9:42) UGA – Stetson Bennett pass to Brock Bowers for 18 yds (Jack Podlesny KICK) (Alabama 38–24)

| Statistics | Georgia | Alabama |
|---|---|---|
| First downs | 30 | 25 |
| Total yards | 449 | 536 |
| Rushing yards | 109 | 115 |
| Passing yards | 340 | 421 |
| Turnovers | 2 | 0 |
| Time of possession | 34:13 | 25:47 |

| Team | Category | Player | Statistics |
|---|---|---|---|
| Georgia | Passing | Stetson Bennett | 29/48, 340 yards, 3 TD's, 2 INT's |
| Georgia | Rushing | James Cook | 11 carries, 38 yards |
| Georgia | Receiving | Brock Bowers | 10 receptions, 139 yards, 1 TD |
| Alabama | Passing | Bryce Young | 26/44, 421 yards, 3 TD's |
| Alabama | Rushing | Brian Robinson Jr. | 16 carries, 55 yards |
| Alabama | Receiving | Jameson Williams | 7 receptions, 184 yards, 2 TD's |

== Postseason ==
=== Vs. No. 4 Cincinnati ===
Goodyear Cotton Bowl Classic - CFP Semifinal

| Team | 1 | 2 | 3 | 4 | Total |
|---|---|---|---|---|---|
| No. 4 Cincinnati | 3 | 0 | 3 | 0 | 6 |
| • No. 1 Alabama | 7 | 10 | 0 | 10 | 27 |

- Date: December 31
- Location: Arlington, TX
- Game start: 2:40 p.m.
- Game attendance: 76,313
- Game weather: Indoors
- Referee: Steve Strimling
- TV announcers (ESPN): Sean McDonough (play-by-play), Todd Blackledge (color), Molly McGrath and Laura Rutledge (sideline)

| Statistics | Cincinnati | Alabama |
|---|---|---|
| First downs | 13 | 27 |
| Total yards | 218 | 482 |
| Rushing yards | 74 | 301 |
| Passing yards | 144 | 181 |
| Turnovers | 0 | 1 |
| Time of possession | 26:19 | 33:41 |

| Team | Category | Player | Statistics |
|---|---|---|---|
| Cincinnati | Passing | Desmond Ridder | 17/32, 144 yards |
| Cincinnati | Rushing | Jerome Ford | 15 carries, 77 yards |
| Cincinnati | Receiving | Michael Young Jr. | 4 receptions, 55 yards |
| Alabama | Passing | Bryce Young | 17/28, 181 yards, 3 TD's, 1 INT |
| Alabama | Rushing | Brian Robinson Jr. | 26 carries, 204 yards |
| Alabama | Receiving | Ja'Corey Brooks | 4 receptions, 66 yards, 1 TD |

=== Vs. No. 3 Georgia ===
CFP National Championship

| Team | 1 | 2 | 3 | 4 | Total |
|---|---|---|---|---|---|
| • No. 3 Georgia | 0 | 6 | 7 | 20 | 33 |
| No. 1 Alabama | 3 | 6 | 0 | 9 | 18 |

- Date: January 10, 2022
- Location: Indianapolis, IN
- Game start: 8:16 p.m.
- Game attendance: 68,311
- Game weather: Indoors
- Referee: Duane Heydt
- TV announcers (ESPN): Chris Fowler (play-by-play), Kirk Herbstreit (color), Holly Rowe and Molly McGrath (sideline)

| Statistics | Georgia | Alabama |
|---|---|---|
| First downs | 20 | 22 |
| Total yards | 364 | 399 |
| Rushing yards | 140 | 30 |
| Passing yards | 224 | 369 |
| Turnovers | 1 | 2 |
| Time of possession | 28:29 | 31:31 |

| Team | Category | Player | Statistics |
|---|---|---|---|
| Georgia | Passing | Stetson Bennett | 17/26, 224 yards, 2 TD's |
| Georgia | Rushing | Zamir White | 13 carries, 84 yards, 1 TD |
| Georgia | Receiving | George Pickens | 1 reception, 52 yards |
| Alabama | Passing | Bryce Young | 35/57, 369 yards, 1 TD, 2 INT's |
| Alabama | Rushing | Brian Robinson Jr. | 22 carries, 68 yards |
| Alabama | Receiving | Cameron Latu | 5 receptions, 102 yards, 1 TD |

== Rankings ==
Ranking movements Legend: ██ Increase in ranking ██ Decrease in ranking ( ) = First-place votes
| | Week | | | | | | | | | | | | | | | |
| Poll | Pre | 1 | 2 | 3 | 4 | 5 | 6 | 7 | 8 | 9 | 10 | 11 | 12 | 13 | 14 | Final |
|---|---|---|---|---|---|---|---|---|---|---|---|---|---|---|---|---|
| AP | 1 (47) | 1 (59) | 1 (60) | 1 (59) | 1 (58) | 1 (53) | 5 | 4 | 3 | 3 | 3 | 2 | 3 | 4 | 1 (50) | 2 |
| Coaches | 1 (63) | 1 (64) | 1 (64) | 1 (64) | 1 (64) | 1 (63) | 5 | 4 | 3 | 3 | 2 | 2 | 2 | 2 | 1 (54) | 2 |
| CFP | Not released | | | | | | | | | 2 | 2 | 2 | 3 | 3 | 1 | Not released |

== Statistics ==
=== Scoring ===
==== Scores by quarter (non-conference opponents) ====
| | 1 | 2 | 3 | 4 | Total |
|---|---|---|---|---|---|
| All opponents | 6 | 10 | 20 | 14 | 50 |
| Alabama | 66 | 100 | 35 | 40 | 241 |

==== Scores by quarter (SEC opponents) ====
| | 1 | 2 | 3 | 4 | OT | Total |
|---|---|---|---|---|---|---|
| SEC opponents | 47 | 57 | 58 | 71 | 12 | 245 |
| Alabama | 62 | 110 | 68 | 103 | 14 | 357 |

==== Scores by quarter (All opponents) ====
| | 1 | 2 | 3 | 4 | OT | Total |
|---|---|---|---|---|---|---|
| All opponents | 53 | 67 | 78 | 85 | 12 | 295 |
| Alabama | 128 | 210 | 103 | 143 | 14 | 598 |

=== Team statistics ===
Team Statistics
| | Alabama | Opponents |
|---|---|---|
| Total Points | 367 | 165 |
| Total Points per game | 45.8 | 20.3 |
| Total Touchdowns | 48 | 20 |
| Total First Downs | 199 | 143 |
| Rushing | 71 | 47 |
| Passing | 95 | 75 |
| Penalties | 16 | 21 |
| Rushing Total Yards | 1,368 yrds | 718 yrds |
| Rushing yards for loss | 167 yrds | 219 yrds |
| Rushing Attempts | 307 | 249 |
| Average Per Rushing ATTs | 4.5 | 2.9 |
| Average Per Game | 171.0 | 89.8 |
| Rushing TDs | 16 | 7 |
| Passing total yards | 2,584 yrds | 1,752 yrds |
| Comp–Att-INTs | 161-233-3 | 157–243–11 |
| Average Per Game | 323.0 | 219.0 |
| Average per attempt | 9.3 | 7.2 |
| Passing TDs | 27 | 12 |
| Total Offensive plays | 583 | 492 |
| Total Yards | 3,378 yrds | 2,470 yrds |
| Average per plays | 6.8 | 5.0 |
| Average per games | 482.6 | 308.8 |
| Kickoff Returns: # – Yards- TDs | 13-381-2 | 13–271–0 |
| Average per kickoff | 29.3 | 20.8 |
| Punt Returns: # – Yards- TDs | 15-176-0 | 6–40–0 |
| Average per punt | 11.7 | 6.6 |
| INT Returns: # – Yards- TDs | 10-97-0 | 3–17–0 |
| Average per interceptions | 9.7 | 5.6 |
| Kicking - Punt Yards | 19-729 | 15-619 |
| Punt average per games | 26.0 | 20.8 |
| Punt net. average | 37.2 | 37.6 |
| FG: FGM - FGA | 9-10 | 9-9 |
| Onside kicks | 0-0 | 0-0 |
| Penalties – Yards | 54-507 | 57-460 |
| Average per games (YRDS) | 72.0 | 57.5 |
| Time of possession | 33:35 | 31:59 |
| Average per game | 32:49 | 27:11 |
| Miscellaneous: 3rd–Down Conversion % | 58.4% | 33.0% |
| Miscellaneous:4th–Down Conversion % | 77.7% | 50.0% |
| Sacks - Yards | 16–88 | 10–46 |
| Fumbles – Fumbles Lost | 6-2 | 5–2 |
| Miscellaneous: Yards | 0 | 0 |
| Turnover ratios | 7 | 0 |
| Red Zone: Score attempts | 39-42 | 18-20 |
| Red Zone: Touchdowns | 31-42 | 11–20 |

=== Offense ===
Passing statistics
| # | NAME | POS | RAT | CMP | ATT | YDS | TD | INT | % | AVG |
|---|---|---|---|---|---|---|---|---|---|---|
| #2 | Jalen Milroe | QB | 315.8 | 1 | 2 | 24 yrds | 1 TDs | O INTs | 50% | 8.0 |
| #9 | Bryce Young | QB | 177.1 | 187 | 267 | 2,453 yrds | 26 TDs | 3 INTs | 70.0% | 306.6 |
| #17 | Paul Tyson | QB | 185.5 | 4 | 7 | 107 yrds | 0 TDs | 0 INTs | 57.1% | 21.4 |
| | TOTALS | | 178.3 | 192 | 276 | 2,584 yrds | 27 TDs | 3 INTs | 69.5% | 323.0 |
| | OPPONENTS | | 132.4 | 157 | 243 | 1,752 yrds | 12 TDs | 11 INTs | 64.6% | 219.0 |

Rushing statistics
| # | NAME | POS | CAR | YDS | AVG | LONG | TD | AVG/PG |
|---|---|---|---|---|---|---|---|---|
| #1 | Jameson Williams | WR | 1 carries | 4 yrds | 4.0 | 4 | 0 TDs | 0.5 |
| #2 | Jalen Milroe | QB | 10 carries | 31 yrds | 3.1 | 14 | 0 TDs | 10.3 |
| #4 | Brian Robinson Jr. | RB | 142 carries | 706 yrds | 5.0 | 24 | 11 TDs | 100.8 |
| #6 | Trey Sanders | RB | 27 carries | 129 yrds | 4.8 | 20 | 1 TDs | 18.4 |
| #8 | John Metchie III | WR | 1 carries | 8 yrds | 8.0 | 8 | 0 TDs | 1.0 |
| #9 | Bryce Young | QB | 38 carries | 40 yrds | 1.1 | 16 | 2 TDs | 5.0 |
| #21 | Jase McClellan | RB | 34 carries | 163 yrds | 4.8 | 27 | 1 TDs | 40.8 |
| #23 | Roydell Williams | RB | 45 carries | 264 yrds | 5.9 | 55 | 1 TDs | 33.0 |
| | TOTALS | | 307 carries | 1,368 yrds | 4.5 | 55 | 16 TDs | 171.0 |
| | OPPONENTS | | 249 carries | 718 yrds | 2.9 | 30 | 7 TDs | 89.7 |

Receiving statistics
| # | NAME | POS | REC | YDS | AVG | LONG | TD | AVG/PG |
|---|---|---|---|---|---|---|---|---|
| #1 | Jameson Williams | WR | 35 receptions | 710 yrds | 20.2 | 94 | 6 TDs | 88.7 |
| #4 | Brian Robinson Jr. | RB | 17 receptions | 161 yrds | 9.4 | 51 | 2 TDs | 23.0 |
| #5 | Javon Baker | WR | 5 receptions | 80 yrds | 16.0 | 35 | 1 TDs | 20.0 |
| #6 | Trey Sanders | RB | 1 reception | 3 yrds | 3.0 | 0 TDs | 3 | 0.7 |
| #8 | John Metchie III | WR | 52 receptions | 601 yrds | 11.5 | 46 | 5 TDs | 75.1 |
| #10 | JoJo Earle | WR | 12 receptions | 148 yrds | 12.3 | 39 | 0 TDs | 18.5 |
| #11 | Traeshon Holden | WR | 6 receptions | 75 yrds | 12.5 | 21 | 0 TDs | 12.5 |
| #18 | Slade Bolden | WR | 20 receptions | 189 yrds | 9.4 | 29 | 1 TDs | 23.6 |
| #19 | Jahleel Billingsley | TE | 11 receptions | 186 yrds | 16.9 | 33 | 2 TDs | 23.2 |
| #21 | Jase McClellan | RB | 10 receptions | 97 yrds | 9.7 | 21 | 3 TDs | 19.4 |
| #81 | Cameron Latu | TE | 13 receptions | 187 yrds | 14.3 | 27 | 5 TDs | 23.3 |
| #84 | Agiye Hall | WR | 1 reception | 10 yrds | 10.0 | 10 | 0 TDs | 3.3 |
| | TOTALS | | 192 receptions | 2,584 yrds | 13.4 | 94 | 27 TDs | 323.0 |
| | OPPONENTS | | 157 receptions | 1,752 yrds | 11.1 | 70 | 12 TDs | 219.0 |

=== Defense ===
Defense statistics
| # | NAME | POS | SOLO | AST | TOT | TFL-YDS | SACK-YDS | INT | TD | YRDs | BU | QBH | FR-YDS | FF | FFTD | KICK | | |
|---|---|---|---|---|---|---|---|---|---|---|---|---|---|---|---|---|---|---|
| #1 | Jameson Williams | WR | 1 | 0 | 1 | 0-0 | 0–0 | – | - | – | – | – | – | – | – | – | - | - |
| #1 | Kool-Aid McKinstry | DB | 1 | 7 | 8 | 0–0 | 0–0 | 1 | - | - | 1 | – | – | – | – | – | - | - |
| #2 | DeMarco Hellams | DB | 28 | 16 | 44 | 0–0 | 0–0 | 2 | - | – | – | – | – | – | – | – | - | - |
| #3 | Daniel Wright | DB | 10 | 8 | 18 | 0–0 | 0–0 | – | - | - | 2 | 1 | – | – | – | – | - | - |
| #4 | Brian Robinson Jr. | RB | – | – | – | 0–0 | 0–0 | – | - | – | – | – | – | – | – | – | - | - |
| #4 | Christopher Allen | LB | 2 | 1 | 3 | 1.0-7 | 1.0-7 | - | – | – | – | – | - | 1 | – | – | - | - |
| #5 | Jalyn Armour-Davis | DB | 11 | 7 | 18 | 1.0–1 | 0–0 | 2 | - | - | 3 | 1 | – | – | – | – | - | - |
| #6 | Khyree Jackson | DB | 1 | 0 | 1 | 0-0 | 0–0 | – | – | – | – | – | – | – | – | - | - | - |
| #7 | Ja'Corey Brooks | WR | – | – | – | 0–0 | 0–0 | – | – | – | – | – | - | – | – | 1 | - | - |
| #8 | John Metchie III | WR | – | – | – | 0–0 | 0–0 | – | – | – | – | – | – | – | – | - | - | - |
| #8 | Christian Harris | LB | 23 | 19 | 42 | 5.0-12 | 1.0-4 | - | - | - | 1 | 1 | – | – | – | – | - | - |
| #9 | Bryce Young | QB | – | – | – | 0–0 | 0–0 | - | - | – | – | – | – | – | – | – | - | - |
| #9 | Jordan Battle | DB | 22 | 20 | 42 | 0–0 | 0–0 | 2 | 1 | 69 yrds | – | – | – | – | – | – | - | - |
| #10 | JoJo Earle | WR | 0 | 1 | 1 | 0–0 | 0–0 | – | – | – | – | – | – | – | – | - | | |
| #10 | Henry To'oTo'o | LB | 22 | 37 | 59 | 1.5–6 | 0–0 | – | – | 1 | – | – | – | – | – | - | | |
| #11 | Traeshon Holden | WR | 0 | 1 | 1 | 0–0 | 0–0 | – | – | – | – | – | – | – | – | - | | |
| #11 | Kristian Story | DB | 0 | 1 | 1 | 0–0 | 0–0 | – | – | – | – | – | – | – | – | - | | |
| #13 | Malachi Moore | DB | 4 | 3 | 7 | 0–0 | 0–0 | 1 | – | – | – | – | – | – | – | - | | |
| #14 | Brian Branch | DB | 8 | 3 | 11 | 1.0-2 | 0–0 | 0 | 2 | 1 | – | – | – | – | – | - | | |
| #15 | Dallas Turner | LB | 1 | 3 | 4 | 0–0 | 0–0 | – | – | 1 | – | – | – | – | – | - | | |
| #16 | Will Reichard | PK | – | – | – | 0–0 | 0–0 | – | – | – | – | – | – | – | – | - | | |
| #18 | LaBryan Ray | DL | 0 | 2 | 2 | 0–0 | 0–0 | – | – | 1 | – | – | – | – | – | - | | |
| #20 | Drew Sanders | LB | 10 | 10 | 20 | 1.0–4 | 0–0 | – | 2 | 4 | – | – | – | – | – | - | | |
| #21 | Jase McClellan | RB | 1 | 3 | 4 | 0-0 | 0–0 | – | – | – | – | – | – | – | – | - | | |
| #23 | Roydell Williams | RB | 1 | 0 | 1 | 0–0 | 0–0 | – | – | – | – | – | – | – | – | - | | |
| #26 | Marcus Banks | DB | 2 | 2 | 4 | 0.5–0 | 0–0 | 1 | – | – | – | – | – | – | – | - | | |
| #28 | Josh Jobe | DB | 7 | 4 | 11 | 0–0 | 0–0 | 0 | 2 | – | – | – | – | – | – | - | | |
| #30 | King Mwikuta | LB | 1 | 0 | 1 | 1.0–20 | 0–0 | – | – | – | – | – | – | – | – | - | | |
| #31 | Will Anderson Jr. | LB | 10 | 14 | 24 | 8.5-28 | 2.0-14 | – | – | 1 | – | – | – | – | – | - | | |
| #35 | Shane Lee | LB | 0 | 2 | 2 | 0–0 | 0–0 | – | – | 1 | – | – | – | – | – | - | | |
| #37 | Demouy Kennedy | LB | 0 | 3 | 3 | 0–0 | 0–0 | – | – | – | – | – | – | – | – | - | | |
| #40 | Kendrick Blackshire | LB | 2 | 1 | 3 | 0–0 | 0–0 | – | – | – | – | – | – | – | – | - | | |
| #41 | Chris Braswell | LB | 4 | 6 | 10 | 0–0 | 0–0 | – | – | 1 | – | – | - | – | – | - | | |
| #42 | Jaylen Moody | LB | 3 | 8 | 11 | 0–0 | 0–0 | 1 | – | – | - | – | – | – | – | - | | |
| #47 | Byron Young | DL | 6 | 10 | 16 | 5.5–17 | 1.0–6 | – | – | 1 | – | – | – | – | – | - | | |
| #48 | Phidarian Mathis | DL | 9 | 18 | 27 | 2.5-13 | 2.5-13 | – | – | – | 1 | 1 | – | – | – | - | | |
| #50 | Timothy Smith | DL | 3 | 8 | 11 | 1.5-2 | 0.5-1 | – | – | – | – | – | – | – | – | - | | |
| #71 | Darrian Dalcourt | DL | 1 | 0 | 1 | 0–0 | 0–0 | – | – | – | – | – | – | – | – | - | | |
| #82 | Chase Allen | PK | 2 | 1 | 3 | 1.0–7 | 1.0–7 | – | – | – | - | 1 | – | – | – | - | | |
| #90 | Stephon Wynn Jr. | DL | 0 | 4 | 4 | 0–0 | 0–0 | – | – | – | – | – | – | – | – | - | | |
| #92 | Justin Egboigbe | DL | 3 | 4 | 7 | 0–0 | 0–0 | – | 1 | – | – | – | – | – | – | - | | |
| #94 | D. J. Dale | DL | 6 | 0 | 6 | 2.0-7 | 1.0-4 | – | – | 1 | – | – | – | – | – | - | | |
| #98 | Jamil Burroughs | DL | 2 | 0 | 2 | 1.0–9 | 1.0–9 | – | – | – | – | – | – | – | – | - | | |
| | TOTAL | | 160 | 191 | 351 | 38.0-151 | 13.0-78 | 6 | 1 | 14 | 21 | 2 | 3 | 1 | - | - | - | 0 |
| | OPPONENTS | | 178 | 220 | 398 | 31.0–105 | 10.0–46 | 2 | 0 | 8 | 14 | 1 | 4 | – | – | - | - | - |

Key: POS: Position, SOLO: Solo Tackles, AST: Assisted Tackles, TOT: Total Tackles, TFL: Tackles-for-loss, SACK: Quarterback Sacks, INT: Interceptions, BU: Passes Broken Up, PD: Passes Defended, QBH: Quarterback Hits, FR: Fumbles Recovered, FF: Forced Fumbles, BLK: Kicks or Punts Blocked, SAF: Safeties, TD : Touchdown

=== Special teams ===
Kicking statistics
| # | NAME | POS | XPM | XPA | XP% | FGM | FGA | FG% | 1–19 | 20–29 | 30–39 | 40–49 | 50+ | LNG | BLK | PTS | KICKS | YDS | AVG | TB | OB |
|---|---|---|---|---|---|---|---|---|---|---|---|---|---|---|---|---|---|---|---|---|---|
| #16 | Will Reichard | PK | 47 | 47 | 100% | 10 | 12 | 83% | 0-0 | 3-3 | 3-4 | 3-3 | 1-2 | 51 | - | 77 | 62 | 3,790 yrds | 61.1 | 35 | 3 |
| #95 | Jack Martin | P | – | – | % | – | – | % | 0/0 | 0/0 | 0/0 | 0/0 | 0/0 | – | – | - | 4 | 232 yrds | 58.0 | 2 | 1 |
| | TOTALS | | 47 | 47 | 100% | 10 | 12 | 83% | 0-0 | 3-3 | 3-4 | 3-3 | 1-2 | 51 | - | 77 | 66 | 4,022 yrds | 60.3 | 37 | 4 |
| | OPPONENTS | | 10 | 11 | 83% | 9 | 9 | 100% | 0-0 | 3-3 | 5-5 | 1-1 | 0-0 | 44 | 0 | 0 | 35 | 2,042 | 58.3 | 16 | 2 |

Kickoff returns statistics
| # | NAME | POS | RTNS | YDS | AVG/PG | TD | LNG |
|---|---|---|---|---|---|---|---|
| #1 | Jameson Williams | WR | 8 KO returns | 315 yrds | 39.3 | 2 TDs | 100 |
| #18 | Slade Bolden | WR | 4 KO returns | 52 yrds | 13.0 | 0 TDs | 24 |
| #19 | Jahleel Billingsley | TE | 1 KO return | 17 yrds | 17.0 | 0 TDs | 17 |
| #81 | Cameron Latu | TE | 2 KO returns | 7 yrds | 3.5 | 0 TDs | 7 |
| | TOTALS | | 15 KO returns | 391 yrds | 26.0 | 2 TDs | 100 |
| | OPPONENTS | | 13 KO returns | 271 yrds | 20.8 | 1 TDs | 96 |

Punting statistics
| # | NAME | POS | PUNTS | YDS | AVG | LONG | TB | FC | I–20 | 50+ | BLK |
|---|---|---|---|---|---|---|---|---|---|---|---|
| #86 | James Burnip | P | 21 | 814 yrds | 38.7 | 48 | 0 | 8 | 5 | 0 | 0 |
| | Team | P | 0 | 0 yrds | 0.0 | 0 | 0 | | 0 | 0 | 1 |
| | TOTALS | | 21 | 814 yrds | 38.7 | 48 | 0 | 8 | 5 | 0 | 1 |
| | OPPONENTS | | 15 | 1,123 yrds | 43.1 | 60 | 1 | 4 | 7 | 7 | 1 |

Punt return statistics
| # | NAME | POS | RTNS | YDS | AVG | TD | LNG |
|---|---|---|---|---|---|---|---|
| #7 | Ja'Corey Brooks | WR | 1 PNT return | 19 yrds | 19.0 | 0 TDs | 0 |
| #10 | JoJo Earle | WR | 10 PNT returns | 64 yrds | 6.4 | 0 TDs | 29 |
| #18 | Slade Bolden | WR | 6 PNT returns | 49 yrds | 8.1 | 0 TDs | 25 |
| #21 | Jase McClellan | RB | 0 PNT returns | 33 yrds | 0.0 | 1 TDs | 33 |
| #30 | King Mwikuta | LB | 0 PNT returns | 0 yrds | 0.0 | 1 TDs | 0 |
| #41 | Chris Braswell | LB | 1 PNT returns | 11 yrds | 11.0 | 0 TDs | 0 |
| | TOTALS | | 18 PNT returns | 176 yrds | 9.7 | 2 TDs | 33 |
| | OPPONENTS | | 6 PNT returns | 40 yrds | 6.6 | 0 TDs | 18 |

== After the season ==
=== Awards and SEC honors ===
Weekly honors
| Honors | Player | Position | Date Awarded | Ref. |
|---|---|---|---|---|
| SEC Offensive Player of the Week; SEC Special Teams Player of the Week | Bryce Young | QB | September 7, 2021 | |
| SEC Offensive Player of the Week; SEC Special Teams Player of the Week | Will Reichard | PK | September 7, 2021 | |
| Davey O’Brien National Quarterback of the Week | Bryce Young | QB | September 8, 2021 | |
| SEC Defensive Player of the Week | Will Anderson Jr. | LB | September 20, 2021 | |
| SEC Special Teams Player of the Week | Jameson Williams | WR/KR | September 27, 2021 | |
| SEC Defensive Player of the Week (2) | Will Anderson | LB | October 4, 2021 | |
| SEC Offensive Player of the Week (2) | Brian Robinson Jr. | RB | October 4, 2021 | |
| Reese's Senior Bowl; Walter Camp; Maxwell Award National Player of the Week | Brian Robinson Jr. | RB | October 5, 2021 | |
| Bednarik Award National Player of the Week | Will Anderson | LB | October 5, 2021 | |
| SEC Defensive Player of the Week (3) | Will Anderson | LB | October 18, 2021 | |
| Bednarik Award National Player of the Week (2x) | Will Anderson | LB | October 19, 2021 | |
| Bronko Nagurski Award National Player of the Week | Will Anderson | LB | October 19, 2021 | |
| Manning Award (Great 8) | Bryce Young | QB | October 19, 2021 | |
| Manning Award (Great 8-2x) | Bryce Young | QB | October 26, 2021 | |
| SEC Offensive Player of the Week (2) | Bryce Young | QB | September 25, 2021 | |
| SEC Defensive Player of the Week (4) | Will Anderson | LB | November 8, 2021 | |
| Bednarik Award National Player of the Week (3x) | Will Anderson | LB | November 9, 2021 | |
| SEC Offensive Player of the Week (2) | Bryce Young | QB | November 22, 2021 | |
| SEC Defensive Player of the Week | Henry To'oTo'o | LB | November 22, 2021 | |
| Walter Camp Player of the Week | Henry To'oTo'o | LB | November 22, 2021 | |
| SEC Defensive Player of the Week (5) | Will Anderson | LB | November 29, 2021 | |

Southeastern Conference Individual Awards
| Player | Position | Award | Ref. |
|---|---|---|---|
| Bryce Young | QB | SEC Offensive Player of the Year | |
| Will Anderson Jr. | LB | SEC Defensive Player of the Year | |
| Jameson Williams | WR | SEC Co-Special Teams Player of the Year | |

Individual Yearly Awards
| Player | Position | Award | Ref. |
|---|---|---|---|
| Bryce Young | QB | Heisman Trophy; Maxwell Award; Davey O’Brien Award; AP College Football Player of the Year; Sporting News College Football Player of the Year; Manning Award | |
| Will Anderson Jr. | LB | Bronko Nagurski Trophy | |

=== All-Americans ===
All-SEC
| Player | Position | Team |
|---|---|---|
| Bryce Young | QB | 1st |
| Brian Robinson Jr. | RB | 1st |
| Jameson Williams | WR | 1st |
| Evan Neal | OT | 1st |
| Will Anderson Jr. | LB | 1st |
| Jordan Battle | DB | 1st |
| John Metchie III | WR | 2nd |
| Phidarian Mathis | DL | 2nd |
| Henry To'oTo'o | LB | 2nd |
| Jalyn Armour-Davis | DB | 2nd |

All-SEC Freshman
| Player | Position |
|---|---|
| JoJo Earle | WR |
| Dallas Turner | LB |
| Kool-Aid McKinstry | DB |

All-SEC Academic
| Player | Position | Class | Major | Ref. |
|---|---|---|---|---|
HM = Honorable mention. Source:

NCAA Recognized All-American Honors
| Player | AP | AFCA | FWAA | TSN | WCFF | Designation |
|---|---|---|---|---|---|---|
| Evan Neal | 2 | 1 | 1 | 1 | 1 | Consensus |
| Will Anderson Jr. | 1 | 1 | 1 | 1 | 1 | Unanimous |
| Jameson Williams | 1 | 2 | 2 | 1 | 2 | |
| Bryce Young | 1 | 2 | 1 | 1 | 2 | Consensus |
| Jordan Battle | 3 | 2 | | | | |
| Phidarian Mathis | | 2 | | | | |
The NCAA recognizes a selection to all five of the AP, AFCA, FWAA, TSN and WCFF first teams for unanimous selections and three of five for consensus selections. HM = Honorable mention. Source:

Other All-American Honors
| Player | Athletic | Athlon | BR | CBS Sports | CFN | ESPN | FOX Sports | Phil Steele | SI | USA Today |

=== NFL draft ===
The NFL draft was held in Las Vegas, Nevada on April 28–30, 2022.

Crimson Tide who were picked in the 2022 NFL draft:

| Round | Pick | Player | Position | NFL team |
|---|---|---|---|---|
| 1 | 7 | Evan Neal | OT | New York Giants |
| 1 | 12 | Jameson Williams | WR | Detroit Lions |
| 2 | 44 | John Metchie III | WR | Houston Texans |
| 2 | 47 | Phidarian Mathis | DT | Washington Commanders |
| 3 | 75 | Christian Harris | LB | Houston Texans |
| 3 | 98 | Brian Robinson Jr. | RB | Washington Commanders |
| 4 | 119 | Jalyn Armour-Davis | CB | Baltimore Ravens |

== Media affiliates ==
=== Radio ===
- WTID (FM) (Tide 102.9) – Nationwide (Dish Network, SiriusXM, TuneIn radio and iHeartRadio)

=== TV ===
- CBS Family – CBS 42 (CBS), CBS Sports Network
- ESPN/ABC Family – ABC 33/40 (ABC), ABC, ESPN, ESPN2, ESPNU, ESPN+, SEC Network)
- FOX Family – WBRC (FOX), FOX/FS1, FSN
- NBC – WVTM-TV, NBC Sports, NBCSN
