= Roydell Williams =

Roydell Williams may refer to:

- Roydell Williams (wide receiver) (born 1981), an American former professional football player
- Roydell Williams (running back) (born 2001), an American professional football player
