= Jahleel Billingsley =

American football player (born 2001)

Profile
- Position: Tight end

Personal information
- Born: May 17, 2001 (age 25); Chicago, Illinois, U.S.
- Listed height: 6 ft 4 in (1.93 m)
- Listed weight: 230 lb (104 kg)

Career information
- High school: Phillips Academy (Chicago, Illinois)
- College: Alabama (2019–2021); Texas (2022)
- NFL draft: 2023: undrafted

Career history
- Calgary Stampeders (2023)*; San Antonio Brahmas (2024)*
- * Offseason or practice squad member only

Awards and highlights
- CFP national champion (2020)

Jahleel Billingsley (born May 17, 2001) is an American professional football tight end. He played college football for the Texas Longhorns and Alabama Crimson Tide.

== Early life ==
Billingsley grew up in Chicago, Illinois, and attended Wendell Phillips Academy High School, where he played football and basketball. He played multiple positions for the Wildcats including tight end, receiver, wildcat quarterback and defensive line. Billingsley was rated a four-star prospect and committed to play college football at Alabama over offers from Auburn, Florida, LSU, Michigan and Ohio State. He was the first Alabama recruit from the state of Illinois since 1997.

== College career ==
Bilingsley played in nine games with two receptions for 16 yards as a freshman. He caught 18 passes for 287 yards and three touchdowns as the Crimson Tide won the 2021 College Football Playoff National Championship. Billingsley also led the team with 89 kick return yards.

Billingsley was moved down the depth chart prior to the start of the 2021 season. When coach Nick Saban was asked about it after the team’s first game against Miami, he said Saban said, “Jahleel and I have talked on several occasions because he's certainly a guy that we want to have success for his own benefit individually, as well as for the team. Sometime when you get a little external encouragement it can be a positive for you.” Billingsley caught a 26-yard touchdown pass in the Crimson Tide's 31-29 win in Week 3 over 11th-ranked Florida and returned to the starting lineup the following game against Southern Miss.

Billingsley ended the 2021 season with 17 receptions for 256 yards and three touchdowns in 13 games.

On January 11, 2022, Billingsley entered the transfer portal after not catching a pass during the CFB Championship for Alabama. Then on January 16, it was announced that Billingsley would be transferring to Texas to play with former Alabama Offensive Coordinator, Steve Sarkisian.

He started his time at Texas with a six-game suspension for "something that happened before his arrival in Texas." During the four games he did play in, he was targeted just six times, making three catches for 38 receiving yards. He left the team before their 2022 season was over.

=== College statistics ===
Year	School	Conf	Class	Pos	G	Receiving			
Year	School	Conf	Class	Pos	G	Rec	Yds	Avg	TD
2019	Alabama	SEC	FR	TE	9	2	16	1.8	0
2020	Alabama	SEC	SO	TE	12	18	287	15.9	3
2021	Alabama	SEC	JR	TE	15	17	256	15.1	3
2022	Texas	Big 12	SR	TE	4	3	38	12.7	0
Career	Texas				36	37	559	15.1	6

== Professional career ==
Pre-draft measurables
Height	Weight	Arm length	Hand span	40-yard dash	10-yard split	20-yard split	20-yard shuttle	Three-cone drill	Vertical jump	Broad jump
6 ft 4 in (1.93 m)	223 lb (101 kg)	32 1/2 in (0.83 m)	9 3/8 in (0.24 m)	4.60 s	1.59 s	2.57 s	4.52 s	7.14 s	36.0 in (0.91 m)	9 ft 9 in (2.97 m)
All values from Pro Day

In late 2022 Billingsley chose to forego his final two years of college eligibility and enter the draft. was not invited to the 2023 NFL Combine, but did participate in Texas' Pro Day. Despite being on draft watch lists, he was not selected in the 2023 NFL draft, but did garner an invite to mini-camp by the Tennessee Titans.

Billingsley was signed by the Calgary Stampeders to their practice roster on July 12, 2023. He was released on July 15.

Billingsley was selected by the San Antonio Brahmas in the 2023 XFL Rookie Draft on June 16, 2023 - before signing with Calgary. After being released by Calgary, he signed with the Brahmas on October 20. He was not part of the roster after the 2024 UFL dispersal draft on January 15, 2024.
