= Cameron Latu =

American football player (born 2000)

No. 36 – New England Patriots
- Position: Tight end/Fullback
- Roster status: Active

Personal information
- Born: February 24, 2000 (age 26); Los Angeles, California, U.S.
- Listed height: 6 ft 5 in (1.96 m)
- Listed weight: 244 lb (111 kg)

Career information
- High school: Olympus (Holladay, Utah)
- College: Alabama (2018–2022)
- NFL draft: 2023: 3rd round, 101st overall pick

Career history
- San Francisco 49ers (2023); Cleveland Browns (2024)*; Philadelphia Eagles (2025); New England Patriots (2026–present)
- * Offseason or practice squad member only

Awards and highlights
- CFP national champion (2020)

Career NFL statistics as of 2025
- Total tackles: 11
- Games played: 15
- Stats at Pro Football Reference

Cameron Latu (born February 24, 2000) is an American professional football tight end and fullback for the New England Patriots of the National Football League (NFL). He played college football for the Alabama Crimson Tide.

== Early life ==
Latu was born in Los Angeles, California to Jillene Argust and Viliami Latu. At the age of 2, he moved to Chisholm, Minnesota. Growing up, he initially played football, basketball and track and field. In 2013, his family moved to Salt Lake City, Utah, where he attended Olympus High School.

As a junior, he recorded 65 tackles with 20 tackles for loss and nine sacks on defense as well as 14 catches for 175 yards and two touchdowns on the offensive side of the ball, helping lead the team to a 8–3 record and playoff berth. He had originally committed to play at BYU along with his identical twin brother but reopened his commitment after a senior year where he had 45 tackles with 8 tackles for loss and 3 sacks on defense and 10 catches for 168 yards and 1 touchdown, 5 rushes for 34 yards rushing on offense and a kick return for 75 yards on special teams. Latu committed to play college football at Alabama over offers from Nebraska, USC, Utah, and 19 other schools.

== College career ==
In 2018, Latu redshirted his true freshman season after playing in two games and recording a tackle in his college debut against Louisville.

In 2019, Latu moved positions from linebacker to tight end before his redshirt freshman season to add much needed depth for the Crimson Tide. Latu would see time in 11 games, mostly on special teams.

In 2020, Latu played primarily on special teams, and began to carve out a role at tight end as a redshirt sophomore, playing in 12 games.

In 2021, Latu was named the Crimson Tide's starting tight end going into his redshirt junior season. Latu caught three passes for 43 yards with two touchdowns in a 44–13 win over Miami in the Chick-fil-A Kickoff Game. Against Southern Miss, Latu scored a touchdown by standing in the end zone and picking up a ball fumbled by John Metchie. Latu would finish his redshirt junior season with a strong showing against Georgia in the College Football Championship game with a career high five catches for 102 yards and one touchdown after Jameson Williams went down with a knee injury.

== Professional career ==
Pre-draft measurables
Height	Weight	Arm length	Hand span	Wingspan	40-yard dash	10-yard split	20-yard split	20-yard shuttle	Three-cone drill	Vertical jump	Broad jump	Bench press
6 ft 4 3/8 in (1.94 m)	242 lb (110 kg)	32 3/8 in (0.82 m)	9 1/2 in (0.24 m)	6 ft 7 1/8 in (2.01 m)	4.78 s	1.66 s	2.69 s	4.32 s	7.31 s	32.5 in (0.83 m)	10 ft 0 in (3.05 m)	14 reps
All values from NFL Combine/Pro Day

=== San Francisco 49ers ===
Latu was selected by the San Francisco 49ers in the third round, 101st overall, of the 2023 NFL draft. Latu suffered a torn meniscus during week 3 of the preseason and was placed on injured reserve on August 29, 2023, effectively ending his first season in the NFL.

Latu was waived by the 49ers on August 27, 2024.

=== Cleveland Browns ===
On August 29, 2024, Latu was signed to the Cleveland Browns practice squad. He was released on December 17. On December 31, the Browns re-signed Latu to their practice squad.

=== Philadelphia Eagles ===
On January 21, 2025, Latu signed a reserve/future contract with the Philadelphia Eagles. He was waived on August 26 as part of final roster cuts and re-signed to the practice squad the next day. On September 24, Latu was signed to the active roster. On September 28, in Week 4 against the Tampa Bay Buccaneers, Latu blocked a punt which was returned by teammate Sydney Brown 35 yards for a touchdown in the Eagles' 31–25 win.

On August 30, 2026, Latu was waived by the Eagles as a part of final roster cuts.

=== New England Patriots ===
On August 31, 2026, Latu was claimed off waivers by the New England Patriots.

== Personal life ==
Latu has a fraternal twin brother named Nathan, who played football at Oklahoma State as a defensive end and had a brief offseason stint with the Saints after going undrafted. He also has an older brother named Sioka.
