= Roydell Williams (running back) =

American football player (born 2001)

Colorado Stampede
- Position: Running back
- Roster status: Unsigned draft pick

Personal information
- Born: December 8, 2001 (age 24)
- Listed height: 5 ft 10 in (1.78 m)
- Listed weight: 214 lb (97 kg)

Career information
- High school: Hueytown (Hueytown, Alabama)
- College: Alabama (2020–2023); Florida State (2024–2025)
- NFL draft: 2026: undrafted

Career history
- Indianapolis Colts (2026)*; Detroit Lions (2026)*; Colorado Stampede (2027-present)
- * Offseason or practice squad member only

Awards and highlights
- CFP national champion (2020)
- Stats at Pro Football Reference

Roydell Williams (born December 8, 2001) is an American professional football running back. He played college football for the Alabama Crimson Tide and Florida State Seminoles.

== Early life ==
Williams attended Hueytown High School in Hueytown, Alabama, and earned an all-state selection as a junior after rushing for 2,757 yards and 32 touchdowns on 291 carries while also adding 21 receptions for 216 yards and three touchdowns. He finished his career with 5,900 rushing yards. Rated as a four-star recruit and the number 20 running back in his class, Williams committed to play college football for the Alabama Crimson Tide over Auburn.

== College career ==
=== Alabama ===
As a freshman in 2020, Williams rushed 19 times for 71 yards and a touchdown. In 2021 he rushed 48 times for 284 yards while notching two total touchdowns before tearing his ACL versus New Mexico State. In 2022 Williams tallied 250 yards and four touchdowns on 56 carries while also bringing in five receptions for 37 yards. In the 2023 SEC Championship, Williams was the starting running back, rushing 16 times for 64 yards and a touchdown in a win over Georgia. In the 2023 season, he ran for 560 yards and five touchdowns while also hauling in one touchdown through the air. After the season, Williams entered the NCAA transfer portal.

Williams finished his Alabama career playing in 45 games rushing for 1,165 yards and 11 touchdowns on 234 carries while also adding 21 receptions for 152 yards and two touchdowns.

=== Florida State ===
Williams transferred to Florida State for the 2024 season.

=== Statistics ===
Year	Team	Games		Rushing				Receiving			
Year	Team	GP	GS	Att	Yds	Avg	TD	Rec	Yds	Avg	TD
2020	Alabama	8	0	19	71	3.7	1	0	0	0.0	0
2021	Alabama	10	0	48	284	5.9	1	5	57	11.4	1
2022	Alabama	13	0	56	250	4.5	4	5	37	7.4	0
2023	Alabama	14	2	111	560	5.0	5	11	58	5.3	1
2024	Florida State	3	3	20	54	2.7	2	5	46	9.2	0
2025	Florida State	0	0	0	0	0.0	0	0	0	0.0	0
Career		48	5	254	1,219	4.8	13	26	198	7.6	2

== Professional career ==
Pre-draft measurables
Height	Weight	Arm length	Hand span	Wingspan	40-yard dash	10-yard split	20-yard split	20-yard shuttle	Three-cone drill	Vertical jump	Broad jump	Bench press
5 ft 8 3/4 in (1.75 m)	215 lb (98 kg)	30 1/2 in (0.77 m)	9 7/8 in (0.25 m)	6 ft 1 1/2 in (1.87 m)	4.71 s	1.59 s	2.60 s	4.27 s	7.08 s	34.0 in (0.86 m)	10 ft 1 in (3.07 m)	17 reps
All values from Pro Day

=== Indianapolis Colts ===
On July 31, 2026, Williams was signed by the Indianapolis Colts. He was waived by Indianapolis on August 19.

=== Detroit Lions ===
On August 24, 2026, Williams was signed by the Detroit Lions. On August 30, he was waived by the Lions as a part of final roster cuts.
