= Christopher Allen (American football) =

American football player (born 1998)

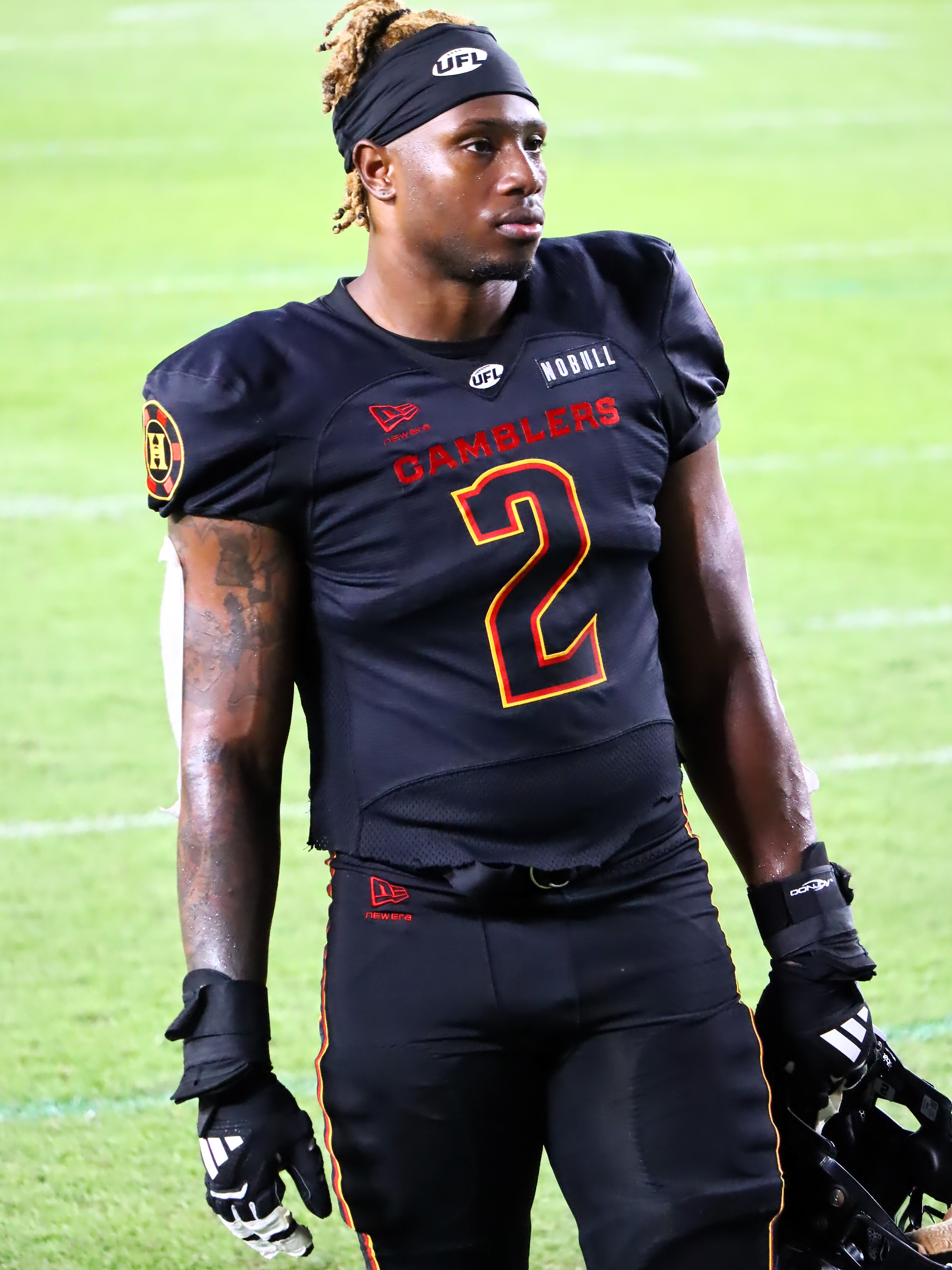
- Allen with the Houston Gamblers in 2026

No. 2 – Dallas Renegades
- Position: Linebacker
- Roster status: Active

Personal information
- Born: August 12, 1998 (age 28); Baton Rouge, Louisiana, U.S.
- Listed height: 6 ft 4 in (1.93 m)
- Listed weight: 249 lb (113 kg)

Career information
- High school: Southern University Laboratory (Baton Rouge, LA)
- College: Alabama (2017–2021)
- NFL draft: 2022: undrafted

Career history
- Denver Broncos (2022); Houston Roughnecks / Gamblers (2024–2026); Dallas Renegades (2027–present)

Awards and highlights
- 2× CFP national champion (2017, 2020); Second-team All-SEC (2020)
- Stats at Pro Football Reference

Christopher Allen (born August 12, 1998) is an American professional football linebacker for the Dallas Renegades of the United Football League (UFL). He played college football at Alabama.

== Early life ==
Allen grew up in Baton Rouge, Louisiana, and attended Southern University Laboratory School. As a senior, he was named the Class 1A Defensive MVP after recording 82 tackles with 14 tackles for loss and six sacks. Allen committed to play college football at Alabama after considering offers from Arkansas, Auburn, and LSU.

== College career ==
Allen played in seven games as a freshman. Allen suffered a season ending injury in preseason training camp going into his sophomore year and was granted a medical redshirt. He returned the next year and played in all 13 of Alabama's games. Allen was named second-team All-Southeastern Conference (SEC) as a redshirt junior after recording 41 tackles with an SEC-leading 13 tackles for loss and six sacks. He suffered a broken foot in the 2021 season opener during his redshirt senior year and missed the remainder of the season.

== Professional career ==
Pre-draft measurables
Height	Weight	Arm length	Hand span	Wingspan	40-yard dash	10-yard split	20-yard split	Vertical jump	Broad jump
6 ft 3 1/2 in (1.92 m)	241 lb (109 kg)	33 in (0.84 m)	10 in (0.25 m)	6 ft 8 1/4 in (2.04 m)	4.79 s	1.64 s	2.72 s	37.0 in (0.94 m)	10 ft 2 in (3.10 m)
All values from NFL Combine/Pro Day

=== Denver Broncos ===
Allen signed with the Denver Broncos as an undrafted free agent on May 12, 2022. He was placed on injured reserve on August 10, 2022. He was waived on August 29, 2023.

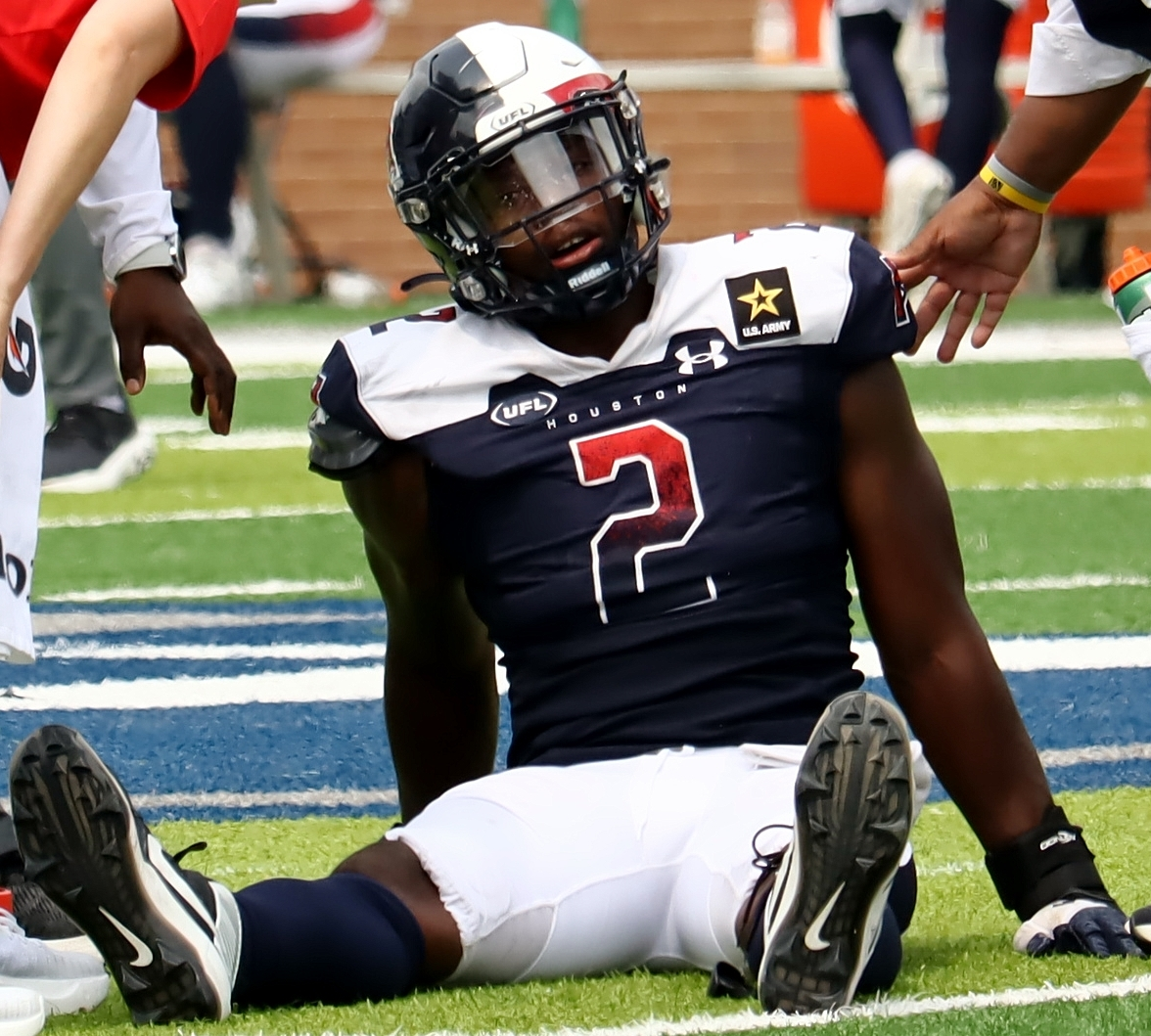
Allen with the Houston Roughnecks in 2024

=== Houston Roughnecks ===
On April 23, 2024, Allen signed with the Houston Roughnecks of the United Football League (UFL). He re-signed with the team on August 22, 2024.

=== Houston Gamblers ===
On January 13, 2026, Allen was selected by the Houston Gamblers of the United Football League (UFL), returning for his 3rd season in the UFL.
