= LaBryan Ray =

American football player (born 1997)

No. 93
- Position: Defensive end

Personal information
- Born: December 5, 1997 (age 28); Madison, Alabama, U.S.
- Listed height: 6 ft 4 in (1.93 m)
- Listed weight: 290 lb (132 kg)

Career information
- High school: James Clemens (Madison)
- College: Alabama (2017–2021)
- NFL draft: 2022: undrafted

Career history
- New England Patriots (2022)*; Philadelphia Stars (2023); Carolina Panthers (2023–2025)
- * Offseason or practice squad member only

Awards and highlights
- 2× CFP national champion (2017, 2020)

Career NFL statistics
- Total tackles: 73
- Sacks: 1
- Stats at Pro Football Reference

LaBryan Ray (born December 5, 1997) is an American former professional football player who was a defensive end in the National Football League (NFL). He played college football for the Alabama Crimson Tide and was signed by the New England Patriots as an undrafted free agent in 2022. Ray was also a member of the Carolina Panthers and the Philadelphia Stars of the United States Football League (USFL).

== Early life ==
Ray attended James Clemens High School in Madison, Alabama. He was a five-star recruit and received offers from Alabama, Florida, Ole Miss, Tennessee, and Arkansas.

== College career ==
In his freshman season, Ray played in only six games due to suffering a foot injury. He recorded five tackles, 2.5 tackles for losses, and one sack for the season. In his second year, he played in all 15 games, and started one of them. In 2020, he recorded 39 tackles, which included 5.5 for losses, and 2.5 sacks. He also recorded two pass deflections, and two quarterback hurries. He later suffered a season-ending lower leg injury in a game against South Carolina. He recorded nine tackles, 1.5 of which were for losses, one sack, and one forced fumble on the year. He was redshirted at the end of the season.

== Professional career ==
Pre-draft measurables
Height	Weight	Arm length	Hand span	Wingspan	40-yard dash	10-yard split	20-yard split	20-yard shuttle	Three-cone drill	Vertical jump	Broad jump	Bench press
6 ft 4 1/4 in (1.94 m)	283 lb (128 kg)	32 5/8 in (0.83 m)	8 1/2 in (0.22 m)	6 ft 7 1/4 in (2.01 m)	5.12 s	1.80 s	2.88 s	4.51 s	7.68 s	28.5 in (0.72 m)	8 ft 8 in (2.64 m)	25 reps
All values from NFL Combine/Pro Day

=== New England Patriots ===
Ray was signed by the New England Patriots as an undrafted free agent on May 9, 2022. He was waived by New England on August 30, and re-signed to the practice squad the next day. Ray signed a reserve/future contract with the Patriots on January 10, 2023. He was waived on February 17.

=== Philadelphia Stars ===
Ray signed with the Philadelphia Stars of the USFL on May 3, 2023. Ray finished the 2023 USFL season with 10 tackles and three sacks through seven games (including five starts). He was released from his contract on July 29, to sign with an NFL team.

=== Carolina Panthers ===
On July 31, 2023, Ray signed with the Carolina Panthers.

On January 8, 2024, the Panthers signed Ray to a one-year contract extension.

On April 21, 2025, Ray re-signed with the Panthers. He began the season on injured reserve due to an ankle injury, and was activated for his season debut on October 4.

On March 10, 2026, Ray re-signed with the Panthers. On August 4, he retired from professional football.

=== Career statistics ===
Year	Team	Games		Tackles							Interceptions						Fumbles				
Year	Team	GP	GS	Cmb	Solo	Ast	TFL	QBH	Sck	Sfty	PD	Int	Yds	Avg	Lng	TD	FF	FR	Yds	Avg	TD
2023	CAR	17	1	19	7	12	0	0	0.0	0	0	0	0	0.0	0	0	0	0	0	0.0	0
2024	CAR	16	9	41	15	26	2	2	1.0	0	0	0	0	0.0	0	0	0	0	0	0.0	0
2025	CAR	13	0	13	7	6	0	0	0.0	0	0	0	0	0.0	0	0	0	0	0	0.0	0
		46	10	73	29	44	2	2	1.0	0	0	0	0	0.0	0	0	0	0	0	0.0	0

== Legal issues ==
On January 11, 2019, Ray refused to leave an establishment located in a shopping center, due to him being intoxicated. He was subsequently arrested, and transferred to the Tuscaloosa County Jail, where he was held on a $500 bond.
