= 2020 Alabama Crimson Tide football team =

American college football season

2020 Alabama Crimson Tide football

Consensus national champion Rose Bowl champion SEC champion SEC Western Division champion

SEC Championship Game, W 52–46 vs. Florida

Rose Bowl (CFP Semifinal) W 31–14 vs. Notre Dame CFP National Championship, W 52–24 vs. Ohio State
- Conference: Southeastern Conference
- Western Division

Ranking
- Coaches: No. 1
- AP: No. 1
- Record: 13–0 (10–0 SEC)
- Head coach: Nick Saban (14th season)
- Offensive coordinator: Steve Sarkisian (2nd season)
- Offensive scheme: Pro spread
- Defensive coordinator: Pete Golding (3rd season)
- Co-defensive coordinator: Charles Kelly (2nd season)
- Base defense: 3–4
- Captains: Landon Dickerson; DeVonta Smith; Alex Leatherwood; Mac Jones
- Home stadium: Bryant–Denny Stadium

Uniform
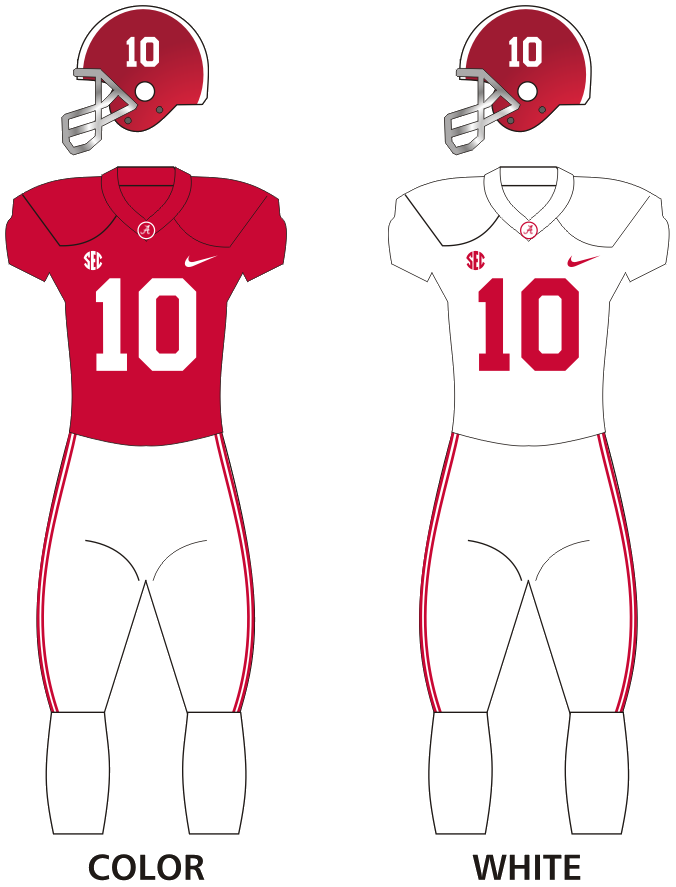

2020 Southeastern Conference football standings
| | Conf. | | | Overall |
| Team | W | | L | W | | L |
|---|---|---|---|---|---|---|
Eastern Division
| No. 13 Florida x | 8 | – | 2 | 8 | – | 4 |
| No. 7 Georgia | 7 | – | 2 | 8 | – | 2 |
| Missouri | 5 | – | 5 | 5 | – | 5 |
| Kentucky | 4 | – | 6 | 5 | – | 6 |
| Tennessee* | 3 | – | 7 | 3 | – | 7 |
| South Carolina | 2 | – | 8 | 2 | – | 8 |
| Vanderbilt | 0 | – | 9 | 0 | – | 9 |
Western Division
| No. 1 Alabama x$#^ | 10 | – | 0 | 13 | – | 0 |
| No. 4 Texas A&M | 8 | – | 1 | 9 | – | 1 |
| Auburn | 6 | – | 4 | 6 | – | 5 |
| LSU* | 5 | – | 5 | 5 | – | 5 |
| Ole Miss | 4 | – | 5 | 5 | – | 5 |
| Arkansas | 3 | – | 7 | 3 | – | 7 |
| Mississippi State | 3 | – | 7 | 4 | – | 7 |
Championship: Alabama 52, Florida 46
# – College Football Playoff champion; ^ – College Football Playoff participant; $ – Conference champion; x – Division champion/co-champions; * – Tennessee vacated all wins due to NCAA violations. LSU was ineligible for postseason due to self imposed ban. Note: Due to COVID-19, the SEC played a conference-only schedule.; Rankings from AP Poll.

The 2020 Alabama Crimson Tide football team represented the University of Alabama in the 2020 NCAA Division I FBS football season. This was the Crimson Tide's 126th overall season, 87th as a member of the Southeastern Conference (SEC), and 29th within the SEC Western Division. They played their home games at Bryant–Denny Stadium in Tuscaloosa, Alabama, and were led by 14th-year head coach Nick Saban (with second-year offensive coordinator Steve Sarkisian serving as acting coach for Game 8, against Auburn, due to COVID-19 protocols).

They finished the season undefeated with a record of 13–0 (10–0 in the SEC) and as national champions. Looking to build on the successes of the 2019 campaign, Alabama entered the 2020 season as the favorite to win the Western Division and meet the Florida Gators in the 2020 SEC Championship Game. Alabama closed the regular season with a 11–0 record including five wins against Top 25-ranked teams—and met the Gators for the SEC Championship in a rematch of the 2016 contest. Alabama was victorious by a final score of 52–46 to capture their 9th SEC championship title. The following day, final College Football Playoff (CFP) standings were unveiled. No. 1 ranked Alabama would meet No. 4 ranked Notre Dame for the Rose Bowl game in a rematch of the 2013 contest, defeated the Fighting Irish 31–14 to meet No. 3 ranked Ohio State Buckeyes for the College Football Playoff National Championship Game in a rematch of their 2015 contest. In the College Football Playoff National Championship, the Crimson Tide defeated the Buckeyes, 52–24, to capture their third CFP National Championship title in seven years. The victory over Ohio State gave Alabama their 18th national championship in football (their 13th wire service title since the AP Poll began in 1936) and their tenth perfect season since 1925.

The season marked the first time a wide receiver at Alabama won the Heisman Trophy, as DeVonta Smith won the award over several finalists including Clemson Tigers quarterback Trevor Lawrence. In addition to the Heisman, Smith won numerous other awards, including the Maxwell Award and the Biletnikoff Award. Other award winners included quarterback Mac Jones (Davey O’Brien Award and Johnny Unitas Golden Arm Award), running back Najee Harris (Doak Walker Award), Alex Leatherwood (Outland Trophy), Landon Dickerson (Rimington Trophy), the offensive line (Joe Moore Award), and offensive coordinator Steve Sarkisian (Broyles Award). Six players were named to various All-America Teams with Patrick Surtain II, DeVonta Smith, Alex Leatherwood, Landon Dickerson, and Najee Harris as unanimous selections and Mac Jones as a consensus selection.

The team finished the 2020 season with a final ranking of No. 1 in both the AP and Coaches' Polls.

Because of their dominance of their all SEC schedule with multiple ranked opponents, and the fact that they finished with three Heisman Trophy candidates, several pundits have called the team the greatest in college football history with ESPN citing them as the greatest team of the playoff era.

== Offseason ==
=== Position key ===
| HalfBack | HB | Center | C | Cornerback | CB | Defensive back | DB | | |
| Defensive end | DE | Defensive lineman | DL | Defensive tackle | DT | End | E | | |
| Fullback | FB | Place Kicker | PK | Guard | G | Halfback | HB | Kicker | K |
| Kickoff returner | KR | Offensive tackle | OT | Offensive lineman | OL | Linebacker | LB | | |
| Long snapper | LS | Split end | SE | Punter | P | Punt returner | PR | Quarterback | QB |
| Running back | RB | Safety | S | Tight end | TE | Wide receiver | WR | | |

=== Offseason departures ===
Six Alabama players with remaining eligibility declared early for the 2020 NFL draft. In addition, 14 seniors from the 2019 team graduated.

2020 Alabama offseason departures
| Name | Number | Pos. | Height | Weight | Year | Hometown | Notes |
|---|---|---|---|---|---|---|---|
| Jerry Jeudy | 4 | WR | 6'1 | 192 | Junior | Deerfield Beach, FL | Declared for NFL Draft |
| Terrell Lewis | 24 | LB | 6'5 | 252 | RS Junior | Washington D.C. | Declared for NFL Draft |
| Xavier McKinney | 15 | DB | 6'1 | 200 | Junior | Roswell, GA | Declared for NFL Draft |
| Henry Ruggs | 11 | WR | 6'0 | 190 | Junior | Montgomery, AL | Declared for NFL Draft |
| Tua Tagovailoa | 13 | QB | 6'1 | 218 | Junior | Ewa Beach, HI | Declared for NFL Draft |
| Jedrick Wills | 74 | OL | 6'5 | 320 | Junior | Lexington, KY | Declared for NFL Draft |
| Shyheim Carter | 5 | DB | 6'0 | 191 | Senior | Kentwood, LA | Graduated |
| Raekwon Davis | 99 | DL | 6'7 | 312 | Senior | Meridian, MS | Graduated |
| Trevon Diggs | 7 | DB | 6'2 | 207 | Senior | Gaithersburg, MD | Graduated |
| Anfernee Jennings | 33 | LB | 6'3 | 259 | RS Senior | Dadeville, AL | Graduated |
| Jared Mayden | 21 | DB | 6'0 | 205 | Senior | Sachse, TX | Graduated |
| Tevita Musika | 91 | DL | 6'1 | 338 | Senior | Milpitas, CA | Graduated |
| Matt Womack | 77 | OL | 6'7 | 325 | RS Senior | Hernando, MS | Graduated |

=== Recruiting ===
College recruiting
| Name | Hometown | School | Height | Weight | Commit date |
|---|---|---|---|---|---|
| Bryce Young; QB | Philadelphia, PA | Mater Dei High School (CA) | 6 ft 0 in (1.83 m) | 180 lb (82 kg) | Sep 22, 2019 |
| Bryce Young; QB | Recruit ratings: Rivals: 247Sports: ESPN: (91) | | | | |
| Chris Braswell; DE | Baltimore, MD | St. Frances Academy | 6 ft 3 in (1.91 m) | 220 lb (100 kg) | Nov 25, 2018 |
| Chris Braswell; DE | Recruit ratings: Rivals: 247Sports: ESPN: (91) | | | | |
| Drew Sanders; ATH | Denton, TX | Billy Ryan High School | 6 ft 5 in (1.96 m) | 220 lb (100 kg) | Apr 29, 2019 |
| Drew Sanders; ATH | Recruit ratings: Rivals: 247Sports: ESPN: (86) | | | | |
| Jase McClellan; RB | Aledo, TX | Aledo High School | 5 ft 11 in (1.80 m) | 200 lb (91 kg) | Dec 18, 2019 |
| Jase McClellan; RB | Recruit ratings: Rivals: 247Sports: ESPN: (86) | | | | |
| Will Anderson Jr. DE | Hampton, GA | Dutchtown High School | 6 ft 3 in (1.91 m) | 229 lb (104 kg) | Jun 17, 2019 |
| Will Anderson Jr. DE | Recruit ratings: Rivals: 247Sports: ESPN: (85) | | | | |
| Roydell Williams; RB | Hueytown, AL | Hueytown High School | 5 ft 11 in (1.80 m) | 200 lb (91 kg) | Nov 24, 2018 |
| Roydell Williams; RB | Recruit ratings: Rivals: 247Sports: ESPN: (84) | | | | |
| Demouy Kennedy; LB | Theodore, AL | Theodore High School | 6 ft 2 in (1.88 m) | 205 lb (93 kg) | Jun 9, 2019 |
| Demouy Kennedy; LB | Recruit ratings: Rivals: 247Sports: ESPN: (84) | | | | |
| Thaiu Jones-Bell; WR | Miami, FL | Miami Carol City Senior High School | 5 ft 11 in (1.80 m) | 185 lb (84 kg) | May 20, 2019 |
| Thaiu Jones-Bell; WR | Recruit ratings: Rivals: 247Sports: ESPN: (84) | | | | |
| Quandarrius Robinson; LB | Birmingham, AL | P.D. Jackson-Olin High School | 6 ft 5 in (1.96 m) | 215 lb (98 kg) | Jun 11, 2019 |
| Quandarrius Robinson; LB | Recruit ratings: Rivals: 247Sports: ESPN: (84) | | | | |
| Brian Branch; S | Tyrone, GA | Sandy Creek High School | 6 ft 0 in (1.83 m) | 175 lb (79 kg) | Apr 19, 2019 |
| Brian Branch; S | Recruit ratings: Rivals: 247Sports: ESPN: (84) | | | | |
| Jah-Marien Latham; DT | Reform, AL | Pickens County High School | 6 ft 3 in (1.91 m) | 270 lb (120 kg) | Nov 19, 2018 |
| Jah-Marien Latham; DT | Recruit ratings: Rivals: 247Sports: ESPN: (84) | | | | |
| Jackson Bratton; LB | Muscle Shoals, AL | Muscle Shoals High School | 6 ft 3 in (1.91 m) | 220 lb (100 kg) | Mar 24, 2018 |
| Jackson Bratton; LB | Recruit ratings: Rivals: 247Sports: ESPN: (83) | | | | |
| Timothy Smith; DT | Sebastian, FL | Sebastian River High School | 6 ft 4 in (1.93 m) | 324 lb (147 kg) | Jul 17, 2019 |
| Timothy Smith; DT | Recruit ratings: Rivals: 247Sports: ESPN: (83) | | | | |
| Kristian Story; ATH | Lanett, AL | Lanett High School | 6 ft 1 in (1.85 m) | 206 lb (93 kg) | Jul 18, 2019 |
| Kristian Story; ATH | Recruit ratings: Rivals: 247Sports: ESPN: (81) | | | | |
| Malachi Moore; CB | Trussville, AL | Hewitt-Trussville High School | 5 ft 11 in (1.80 m) | 171 lb (78 kg) | Aug 13, 2018 |
| Malachi Moore; CB | Recruit ratings: Rivals: 247Sports: ESPN: (81) | | | | |
| Traeshon Holden; WR | Harbor City, CA | Narbonne High School | 6 ft 3 in (1.91 m) | 185 lb (84 kg) | Mar 2, 2019 |
| Traeshon Holden; WR | Recruit ratings: Rivals: 247Sports: ESPN: (81) | | | | |
| Javon Baker; WR | Powder Springs, GA | McEachern High School | 6 ft 0 in (1.83 m) | 180 lb (82 kg) | Nov 25, 2018 |
| Javon Baker; WR | Recruit ratings: Rivals: 247Sports: ESPN: (80) | | | | |
| Seth McLaughlin; OL | Buford, GA | Buford High School | 6 ft 4 in (1.93 m) | 270 lb (120 kg) | Mar 24, 2019 |
| Seth McLaughlin; OL | Recruit ratings: Rivals: 247Sports: ESPN: (80) | | | | |
| Damieon George; OT | Houston, TX | North Shore High School | 6 ft 6 in (1.98 m) | 315 lb (143 kg) | Jun 15, 2019 |
| Damieon George; OT | Recruit ratings: Rivals: 247Sports: ESPN: (80) | | | | |
| Caden Clark; TE | Akron, OH | Archbishop Hoban High School | 6 ft 4 in (1.93 m) | 257 lb (117 kg) | Jul 31, 2018 |
| Caden Clark; TE | Recruit ratings: Rivals: 247Sports: ESPN: (80) | | | | |
| Jamil Burroughs; DT | Powder Springs, Georgia | McEachern High School | 6 ft 4 in (1.93 m) | 322 lb (146 kg) | Oct 16, 2019 |
| Jamil Burroughs; DT | Recruit ratings: Rivals: 247Sports: ESPN: (80) | | | | |
| Jahquez Robinson; CB | Jacksonville, FL | Sandalwood High School | 6 ft 2 in (1.88 m) | 175 lb (79 kg) | Feb 18, 2019 |
| Jahquez Robinson; CB | Recruit ratings: Rivals: 247Sports: ESPN: (79) | | | | |
| Ronald Williams; S | Ferriday, LA | Hutchinson Community College (JC) | 6 ft 2 in (1.88 m) | 190 lb (86 kg) | Dec 14, 2019 |
| Ronald Williams; S | Recruit ratings: Rivals: 247Sports: ESPN: (79) | | | | |
| Javion Cohen; OT | Phenix City, AL | Central High School | 6 ft 5 in (1.96 m) | 275 lb (125 kg) | Dec 11, 2019 |
| Javion Cohen; OT | Recruit ratings: Rivals: 247Sports: ESPN: (79) | | | | |
| Kyle Edwards; RB | Destrehan, LA | Destrehan High School | 6 ft 0 in (1.83 m) | 200 lb (91 kg) | Aug 23, 2019 |
| Kyle Edwards; RB | Recruit ratings: Rivals: 247Sports: ESPN: (79) | | | | |
Overall recruit ranking: Rivals: 3 247Sports: 2 ESPN: 3
Note: In many cases, Scout, Rivals, 247Sports, On3, and ESPN may conflict in their listings of height and weight.; In these cases, the average was taken. ESPN grades are on a 100-point scale.; Sources: "Rivals commits". Rivals.; "ESPN commits". ESPN.; "2020 Team Ranking". Rivals.com.; "247Sports commits". 247Sports.

=== Transfers ===
Outgoing

| Name | No. | Pos. | Height | Weight | Year | Hometown | New school |
|---|---|---|---|---|---|---|---|
| Jerome Ford | #27 | RB | 5'11 | 212 | RS Sophomore | Seffner, Florida | Cincinnati |
| Scott Lashley | #76 | OL | 6'7 | 307 | RS Senior | West Point, Mississippi | Mississippi State |
| Mac Hereford | #36 | WR | 6'2 | 215 | Graduate Senior | Birmingham, Alabama | Vanderbilt |
| Taulia Tagovailoa | #5 | QB | 6’0 | 208 | Freshman | Alabaster, Alabama | Maryland |
| Tyrell Shavers | #14 | WR | 6’6 | 200 | Junior | Lewisville, Texas | Mississippi State |
| Giles Amos | #14 | TE | 6’4 | 242 | Junior | Perry, Georgia | Arkansas State |

Incoming

| Name | No. | Pos. | Height | Weight | Year | Hometown | Prev. school |
|---|---|---|---|---|---|---|---|
| Carl Tucker | 86 | TE | 6'2 | 248 | 2019 | Concord, North Carolina | North Carolina |
| Charlie Scott | 85 | P | 6’1 | 195 | 2019 | Greenwood Village, Colorado | Air Force |

=== 2020 NFL draft ===
==== Team players drafted into the NFL ====
| Round | Pick | Player | Position | NFL team |
|---|---|---|---|---|
| 1 | 5 | Tua Tagovailoa | QB | Miami Dolphins |
| 1 | 10 | Jedrick Wills | OT | Cleveland Browns |
| 1 | 12 | Henry Ruggs | WR | Las Vegas Raiders |
| 1 | 15 | Jerry Jeudy | WR | Denver Broncos |
| 2 | 36 | Xavier McKinney | S | New York Giants |
| 2 | 51 | Trevon Diggs | CB | Dallas Cowboys |
| 2 | 56 | Raekwon Davis | DT | Miami Dolphins |
| 3 | 84 | Terrell Lewis | LB | Los Angeles Rams |
| 3 | 87 | Anfernee Jennings | OLB | New England Patriots |

=== Returning starters ===
Offense

| Player | Class | Position |
|---|---|---|
| Mac Jones | RS Junior | Quarterback |
| DeVonta Smith | Senior | Wide receiver |
| Jaylen Waddle | Junior | Wide receiver |
| Najee Harris | Senior | Running back |
| Miller Forristall | RS Senior | Tight end |
| Landon Dickerson | RS Senior | Offensive line |
| Alex Leatherwood | Senior | Offensive line |
| Evan Neal | Sophomore | Offensive line |
| Deonte Brown | RS Senior | Offensive line |

Defense

| Player | Class | Position |
|---|---|---|
| D. J. Dale | Sophomore | Defensive lineman |
| LaBryan Ray | RS Junior | Defensive lineman |
| Christian Harris | Sophomore | Linebacker |
| Shane Lee | Sophomore | Linebacker |
| Dylan Moses | Senior | Linebacker |
| Patrick Surtain II | Junior | Defensive back |

Special teams

| Player | Class | Position |
|---|---|---|
| Joseph Bulovas | RS Junior | Placekicker |
| Jaylen Waddle | Junior | Kick returner |

== Preseason ==
=== Award watch lists ===
Listed in the order that they were released

| Award | Player | Position | Year |
|---|---|---|---|
| Lott Trophy | Dylan Moses | LB | Sr. |
| Dodd Trophy | Nick Saban | HC | -- |
| Bednarik Award | Dylan Moses | LB | Sr. |
| Bednarik Award | Patrick Surtain II | CB | Jr. |
| Davey O'Brien Award | Mac Jones | QB | RS Jr. |
| Doak Walker Award | Najee Harris | RB | Sr. |
| Biletnikoff Award | DeVonta Smith | WR | Sr. |
| Biletnikoff Award | Jaylen Waddle | WR | Jr. |
| John Mackey Award | Carl Tucker | TE | GS |
| Butkus Award | Shane Lee | LB | So. |
| Butkus Award | Dylan Moses | LB | Sr. |
| Jim Thorpe Award | Patrick Surtain II | DB | Jr. |
| Outland Trophy | Landon Dickerson | OL | RS Sr. |
| Outland Trophy | Alex Leatherwood | OL | Sr. |
| Outland Trophy | Deonte Brown | OL | RS Sr. |
| Outland Trophy | LaBryan Ray | DL | RS Jr. |
| Bronko Nagurski Trophy | Patrick Surtain II | DB | Jr. |
| Bronko Nagurski Trophy | LaBryan Ray | DL | RS Jr. |
| Bronko Nagurski Trophy | Dylan Moses | LB | Sr. |
| Paul Hornung Award | Jaylen Waddle | WR | Jr. |
| Wuerffel Trophy | Miller Forristall | TE | RS Sr. |
| Maxwell Award | Jaylen Waddle | WR | Jr. |
| Maxwell Award | DeVonta Smith | WR | Sr. |
| Maxwell Award | Najee Harris | RB | Sr. |
| Johnny Unitas Golden Arm Award | Mac Jones | QB | RS Jr. |

=== SEC Media Days ===
In the preseason media poll, Alabama was predicted to win the West Division and the Conference Championship Game.

=== Preseason All-SEC teams ===
The Crimson Tide placed 11 players (at 13 positions) on the 2020 Preseason SEC Team as selected by SEC coaches and 13 players (at 15 positions) on the 2020 Preseason SEC Team as selected by SEC media.

Offense

1st team

Najee Harris – RB (Coaches, Media)

DeVonta Smith – WR (Coaches, Media)

Jaylen Waddle – WR (Coaches, Media)

Alex Leatherwood – OL (Coaches, Media)

Landon Dickerson – OL (Coaches, Media)

2nd team

Deonte Brown - OL (Coaches, Media)

3rd team

Mac Jones - QB (Media)

Evan Neal - OL (Coaches, Media)

Landon Dickerson - C (Coaches, Media)

Defense

1st team

LaBryan Ray - DL (Coaches, Media)

Dylan Moses – LB (Coaches, Media)

Patrick Surtain II - DB (Coaches, Media)

3rd team

D. J. Dale - DL (Media)

Josh Jobe - DB (Coaches)

Specialists

1st team

Jaylen Waddle – RS (Coaches, Media)

Jaylen Waddle - AP (Media)

== Personnel ==
=== Coaching staff ===
| Name | Position | Consecutive season at Alabama in current position |
|---|---|---|
| Nick Saban | Head coach | 14th |
| Steve Sarkisian | Offensive coordinator/quarterbacks coach | 2nd |
| Charles Huff | Associate head coach/Running backs coach | 2nd |
| Jeff Banks | Special teams coordinator/Tight end coach | 3rd |
| Pete Golding | Defensive coordinator/Inside linebackers coach | 3rd |
| Charles Kelly | Associate Defensive coordinator/Safeties coach | 2nd |
| Karl Scott | Cornerbacks coach | 3rd |
| Kyle Flood | Offensive line coach | 2nd |
| Holmon Wiggins | Wide receivers coach | 2nd |
| Sal Sunseri | Outside linebackers coach | 2nd |
| Freddie Roach | Defensive line coach | 1st |
| David Ballou | Strength and conditioning | 1st |

Graduate assistants

- Tino Sunseri
- Andy Kwon
- Max Bullough
- Jake Long

Analysts

- Dean Altobelli
- Major Applewhite
- Javier Arenas
- Bert Biffani
- Rob Ezell
- Johnathan Galante
- Butch Jones
- Shiloh Keo
- A. J. Milwee
- Alex Mortensen
- Nick Perry
- Patrick Reilly
- Gordon Steele
- Mike Stoops
- Charlie Strong

=== Roster ===
2020 Alabama Crimson Tide Football
| Quarterback: 7 – Braxton Barker – (redshirt) sophomore (6'1, 202); 9 – Bryce Young – freshman (6'0, 190); 10 – Mac Jones – (redshirt) junior (6'2, 205); 12 – Logan Burnett – senior (6'2, 200); 15 – Paul Tyson – (redshirt) freshman (6'4, 220); 16 – Jayden George – sophomore (6'3, 192); 19 – Stone Hollenbach – sophomore (6'3, 208); Running back: 2 – Keilan Robinson – sophomore (5'9, 184); 4 – Brian Robinson Jr. – senior (6'1, 226); 21 – Jase McClellan – freshman (5'11, 200); 22 – Najee Harris – senior (6'3, 230); 23 – Roydell Williams – freshman (5'10, 207); 26 – Trey Sanders – (redshirt) freshman (6'0, 214); 27 – Kyle Edwards – freshman (6'0, 210); 35 – Connor Bishop – (redshirt) freshman (6'1, 195); Wide receiver: 3 – Xavier Williams – (redshirt) sophomore (6'1, 195); 5 – Javon Baker – freshman (6'1, 183); 6 – DeVonta Smith – senior (6'1, 175); 8 – John Metchie III – sophomore (6'0, 195); 11 – Traeshon Holden – freshman (6'3, 196); 14 – Thaiu Jones-Bell – freshman (6'0, 190); 17 – Jaylen Waddle – junior (5'10, 182); 18 – Slade Bolden – (redshirt) sophomore (5'11, 191); 25 – Jonathan Bennett – freshman (5'8, 178); 31 – Shatarius Williams – freshman (6'3, 187); 32 – C.J. Williams – freshman (5'10, 159); 36 – Bret Bolin – (redshirt) junior (6'0, 176); 42 – Sam Reed – sophomore (6'1, 165); 84 – Joshua Lanier – (redshirt) senior (5'11, 160); 85 – Drew Kobayashi – (redshirt) senior (6'2, 200); 89 – Grant Krieger – sophomore (6'2, 192); Placekicker: 16 – Will Reichard – sophomore (6'1, 180); 82 – Chase Allen – freshman (6'2, 188); 93 – Tripp Slyman – (redshirt) sophomore (6'1, 180); 97 – Joseph Bulovas – (redshirt) junior (6'0, 203); Punter: 12 – Skyler DeLong – junior (6'4, 188); 85 – Charlie Scott – senior (6'1, 195); 95 – Jack Martin – sophomore (6'0, 206); 98 – Sam Johnson – freshman (6'3, 215); 99 – Ty Perine – sophomore (6'1, 190) (PK) | Tight end: 19 – Jahleel Billingsley– sophomore (6'4, 228); 46 – Melvin Billingsley – junior (6'3, 230); 60 – Kendall Randolph – (redshirt) junior (6'4, 296) (OL+); 80 – Michael Parker – (redshirt) sophomore (6'6, 216); 81 – Cameron Latu– (redshirt) sophomore (6'5", 247); 82 – Richard Hunt – (redshirt) freshman (6'7, 235); 86 – Carl Tucker – senior (6'2, 248); 87 – Miller Forristall – (redshirt) senior (6'5, 242); 88 – Major Tennison – (redshirt) junior (6'5, 248); Offensive lineman: 51 – Tanner Bowles – (redshirt) freshman (6'5, 280); 55 – Emil Ekiyor Jr. – (redshirt) sophomore (6'3, 327); 56 – Seth McLaughlin – freshman (6'4, 278); 57 – Javion Cohen – freshman (6'5, 296); 62 – Jackson Roby – junior (6'5", 285); 65 – Deonte Brown – (redshirt) senior (6'4, 338); 66 – Brandon Cade – freshman (6'2, 264); 67 – Donovan Hardin – freshman (6'3, 285); 68 – Alajujuan Sparks Jr. – freshman (6'4, 385); 69 – Landon Dickerson – (redshirt) senior (6'3, 325); 70 – Alex Leatherwood – senior (6'6, 310); 71 – Darrian Dalcourt – sophomore (6'3, 299); 72 – Pierce Quick – (redshirt) freshman (6'5, 291); 73 – Evan Neal – sophomore (6'7, 360); 74 – Damien George – freshman (6'7, 345); 75 – Tommy Brown – (redshirt) sophomore (6'7, 317); 78 – Amari Kight – (redshirt) freshman (6'7, 302); 79 – Chris Owens – (redshirt) senior (6'3, 315); Defensive lineman: 18 – LaBryan Ray – (redshirt) junior (6'5, 292); 47 – Byron Young – sophomore (6'3, 295); 48 – Phidarian Mathis – (redshirt) junior (6'4, 312); 50 – Timothy Smith – freshman (6'4, 315); 52 – Braylen Ingraham – (redshirt) freshman (6'4, 291); 58 – Christian Barmore – (redshirt) sophomore (6'5, 310); 89 – Kyle Mann – freshman (6'0, 270); 90 – Stephon Wynn Jr. – (redshirt) sophomore (6'4, 311); 89 – Gavin Reeder – (redshirt) freshman (6'0, 270); 92 – Justin Eboigbe – sophomore (6'5, 294); 93 – Jah-Marien Latham – freshman (6'3, 290); 94 – D. J. Dale – sophomore (6'4, 308); 96 – Landon Bothwell – (redshirt) sophomore (5'11, 220); 97 – LT Ikner – junior (6'4, 261); 98 – Jamil Burroughs – freshman (6'3, 320) | Linebacker: 1 – Ben Davis – (redshirt) senior (6'4, 243); 4 – Christopher Allen – (redshirt) junior (6'5, 250); 8 – Christian Harris – sophomore (6'2, 244); 10 – Ale Kaho – junior (6'1", 228); 16 – Drew Sanders – freshman (6'5, 230); 23 – Jarez Parks – (redshirt) sophomore (6'4, 239); 24 - Clark Griffin – freshman (5'9, 195); 30 – King Mwikuta – sophomore (6'5, 243); 31 – Will Anderson Jr. – freshman (6'4, 220); 32 – Dylan Moses – senior (6'3, 235); 33 – Jackson Bratton – freshman (6'3, 233); 34 – Quandarrius Robinson – freshman (6'5, 217); 35 – Shane Lee – sophomore (6'0, 246); 37 – Demouy Kennedy – freshman (6'3, 215); 40 – Joshua McMillon – graduate (6'3, 237); 41 – Chris Braswell – freshman (6'3, 220); 42 – Jaylen Moody – junior (6'2, 228); 43 – Jordan Smith – freshman (5'10, 210); 49 – Julian Lowenstein – sophomore (6'1, 201); 51 – Robert Ellis – freshman (6'0", 220); 53 – Matthew Barnhill – sophomore (6'4, 311); 54 – Kyle Flood Jr. – freshman (6'0, 209); 56 – Charlie Skehan – freshman (6'1, 232); 57 – Joe McDonald – (redshirt) senior (6'3, 216); Defensive back: 2 – Patrick Surtain II – junior (6'2, 203); 3 – Daniel Wright – (redshirt) junior (6'1, 190); 5 – Jalyn Armour-Davis – (redshirt) sophomore (6'1, 182); 7 – Brandon Turnage – (redshirt) freshman (6'1, 185); 9 – Jordan Battle – sophomore (6'1, 201); 11 – Kristian Story – freshman (6'2, 198); 13 – Malachi Moore – freshman (6'0, 175); 14 – Brian Branch – freshman (6'1, 178); 15 – Eddie Smith – junior (6'0, 196); 20 – D.J. Douglas – sophomore (6'0, 202); 21 - Jahquez Robinson – freshman (6'2, 185); 22 - Ronald Williams – junior (6'2, 188); 25 – Jacobi McBride– freshman (6'1, 143); 26 – Marcus Banks– sophomore (6'0, 170); 27 – Joshua Robinson – (redshirt) junior (5'9, 180); 28 – Josh Jobe – junior (6'1, 189); 29 – DeMarcco Hellams – sophomore (6'1, 213); 37 – Sam Willoughby – freshman (5'10, 165); 38 – Jalen Edwards – sophomore (6'0, 177); 41 – Carson Ware – sophomore (6'1, 190); 43 – Christian Swann – senior (5'9, 179); Long snappers: 45 – Thomas Fletcher – senior (6'2, 220); 50 – Gabe Pugh – (redshirt) freshman (6'5, 273); 59 – Jake Hall – (redshirt) sophomore (6'3, 194); 61 – Nathan Jones – sophomore (5'10, 176) |
Source and player details, 2020 Alabama Crimson Tide Football Commits (January 15, 2020):

=== Depth chart ===
Defense

FS
Daniel Wright
DeMarcco Hellams
Malachi Moore
Brian Branch

| JACK | WILL | MIKE | SAM |
|---|---|---|---|
| Dylan Moses | Christian Harris | Will Anderson Jr. | Ben Davis |
| Jaylen Moody | Joshua McMillon | Drew Sanders | Christopher Allen |
| Shane Lee | Ale Kaho; Demouy Kennedy | ⋅ | King Mwikuta |

SS
Jordan Battle
Eddie Smith
⋅

CB
Josh Jobe
Marcus Banks
Brandon Turnage

| DE | NT | DE |
|---|---|---|
| LaBryan Ray | D. J. Dale | Christian Barmore |
| Byron Young | Tim Smith | Phidarian Mathis |
| Stephon Wynn | Ishmael Sopsher | Justin Eboigbe |

CB
Patrick Surtain II
Jalyn Armour-Davis
⋅

Offense

WR
DeVonta Smith
Javon Baker
Traeshon Holden

WR
Jaylen Waddle
Slade Bolden
⋅

| LT | LG | C | RG | RT |
|---|---|---|---|---|
| Alex Leatherwood | Deonte Brown | Landon Dickerson | Emil Ekiyor Jr. | Evan Neal |
| Chris Owens | Tommy Brown | Chris Owens | Pierce Quick | Tommy Brown |
| ⋅ | ⋅ | Darrian Dalcourt | Amari Kight | Kendall Randolph |

TE
Miller Forristall
Major Tennison
Carl Tucker
Jahleel Billingsley
Cameron Latu

WR
John Metchie III
Xavier Williams
Thaiu Jones-Bell

QB
Mac Jones
Bryce Young
Paul Tyson

Key reserves
Season-ending injury
Suspension

RB
Najee Harris
Brian Robinson Jr.
Trey Sanders
Jase McClellan
Roydell Williams

Special teams
PK Joseph Bulovas
Will Reichard
Chase Allen
P Sam Johnson
Charlie Scott
Ty Perine
KR Jaylen Waddle
DeVonta Smith
Brian Robinson Jr.
Roydell Williams
PR Jaylen Waddle
Slade Bolden
Patrick Surtain II
Xavier Williams
LS Thomas Fletcher
H Mac Jones
Slade Bolden

True Freshman
Double Position :

== Schedule ==
=== Spring game ===
The Crimson Tide were scheduled to hold spring practices in March and April 2020 with the Alabama football spring game, "A-Day" to take place in Tuscaloosa, AL on April 18. However, due to the COVID-19 pandemic, the events were canceled.

=== Regular season ===
Alabama originally announced its 2020 football schedule on August 7, 2019. The planned schedule consisted of 7 home games, 4 away games, and 1 neutral site game for the regular season.

The COVID-19 pandemic upended this schedule. On July 30, the SEC announced that its non-conference games would be canceled and its teams would play a schedule of ten conference games. This eliminated the Crimson Tide's scheduled non-conference games against Georgia State, Kent State, USC and UT Martin. Per the new schedule, Alabama was set to host five SEC conference opponents: Georgia, Kentucky, Mississippi State (rivalry), Texas A&M, and arch-rival Auburn for the 85th Iron Bowl to close out the regular season on the road. Alabama was to travel to five SEC opponents: Arkansas, Ole Miss (rivalry), Missouri, Tennessee (Third Saturday of October) and rival LSU (rivalry) to close out the SEC regular season on the road. Alabama was not scheduled to play SEC East opponents Florida, South Carolina, and Vanderbilt in the 2020 regular season. The Crimson Tide's bye week was scheduled during Week 7 (on November 7).

| Date | Time | Opponent | Rank | Site | TV | Result | Attendance |
|---|---|---|---|---|---|---|---|
| September 26 | 6:00 p.m. | at Missouri | No. 2 | Faurot Field; Columbia, MO | ESPN | W 38–19 | 11,738 |
| October 3 | 2:30 p.m. | No. 13 Texas A&M | No. 2 | Bryant–Denny Stadium; Tuscaloosa, AL | CBS | W 52–24 | 19,424 |
| October 10 | 6:30 p.m. | at Ole Miss | No. 2 | Vaught–Hemingway Stadium; Oxford, MS (rivalry) | ESPN | W 63–48 | 14,419 |
| October 17 | 7:00 p.m. | No. 3 Georgia | No. 2 | Bryant–Denny Stadium; Tuscaloosa, AL (College GameDay / rivalry) | CBS | W 41–24 | 19,424 |
| October 24 | 2:30 p.m. | at Tennessee | No. 2 | Neyland Stadium; Knoxville, TN (Third Saturday in October) | CBS | W 48–17 | 23,394 |
| October 31 | 6:00 p.m. | Mississippi State | No. 2 | Bryant–Denny Stadium; Tuscaloosa, AL (rivalry) | ESPN | W 41–0 | 19,424 |
| November 21 | 3:00 p.m. | Kentucky | No. 1 | Bryant–Denny Stadium; Tuscaloosa, AL | SECN | W 63–3 | 19,424 |
| November 28 | 2:30 p.m. | No. 22 Auburn | No. 1 | Bryant–Denny Stadium; Tuscaloosa, AL (College GameDay / Iron Bowl) | CBS | W 42–13 | 19,424 |
| December 5 | 7:00 p.m. | at LSU | No. 1 | Tiger Stadium; Baton Rouge, LA (rivalry) | CBS | W 55–17 | 22,349 |
| December 12 | 11:00 a.m. | at Arkansas | No. 1 | Donald W. Reynolds Razorback Stadium; Fayetteville, AR | ESPN | W 52–3 | 16,500 |
| December 19 | 7:00 p.m. | vs. No. 7 Florida | No. 1 | Mercedes-Benz Stadium; Atlanta, GA (SEC Championship Game / rivalry) | CBS | W 52–46 | 16,520 |
| January 1, 2021 | 3:00 p.m. | vs. No. 4 Notre Dame* | No. 1 | AT&T Stadium; Arlington, TX (Rose Bowl – CFP Semifinal) | ESPN | W 31–14 | 18,373 |
| January 11, 2021 | 7:00 p.m. | vs. No. 3 Ohio State* | No. 1 | Hard Rock Stadium; Miami Gardens, FL (CFP National Championship / College GameDay) | ESPN | W 52–24 | 14,926 |
*Non-conference game; Rankings from AP Poll and CFP Rankings after November 24 released prior to game; All times are in Central time

Schedule source:

== Game summaries ==
=== At Missouri Tigers ===
| Team | 1 | 2 | 3 | 4 | Total |
|---|---|---|---|---|---|
| • No. 2 Alabama | 10 | 17 | 7 | 7 | 41 |
| Missouri | 0 | 3 | 0 | 3 | 6 |

- Date: September 26
- Location: Columbia, MO
- Game start: 6:10 p.m.
- Game attendance: 11,738
- Game weather: 79, Clear, Wind S @ 9 mph
- Referee: Alex Moore
- TV announcers (ESPN): Sean McDonough (play-by-play), Todd Blackledge (color), Allison Williams and Todd McShay (sideline)

| Statistics | Alabama | Missouri |
|---|---|---|
| First downs | 22 | 20 |
| Total yards | 414 | 322 |
| Rushing yards | 111 | 69 |
| Passing yards | 303 | 253 |
| Turnovers | 1 | 2 |
| Time of possession | 31:25 | 28:35 |

| Team | Category | Player | Statistics |
|---|---|---|---|
| Alabama | Passing | Mac Jones | 18–24, 249 yards, 2 TDs |
| Alabama | Rushing | Najee Harris | 17 carries, 98 yards, 3 TDs |
| Alabama | Receiving | Jaylen Waddle | 8 receptions, 134 yards, 2 TDs |
| Missouri | Passing | Shawn Robinson | 19–25, 185 yards, 1 TD |
| Missouri | Rushing | Larry Rountree III | 14 carries, 67 yards |
| Missouri | Receiving | Jalen Knox | 5 receptions, 63 yards |

=== No. 13 Texas A&M Aggies ===
| Team | 1 | 2 | 3 | 4 | Total |
|---|---|---|---|---|---|
| No. 13 Texas A&M | 7 | 7 | 3 | 7 | 24 |
| • No. 2 Alabama | 14 | 21 | 7 | 10 | 52 |

- Date: October 3
- Location: Tuscaloosa, AL
- Game start: 2:39 p.m.
- Game attendance: 19,424
- Game weather: 73, Sunny skies, Wind NE @ 2 mph
- Referee: Jason Autrey
- TV announcers (CBS): Brad Nessler (play-by-play), Gary Danielson (color), Jamie Erdahl (sideline)

| Statistics | Texas A&M | Alabama |
|---|---|---|
| First downs | 25 | 22 |
| Total yards | 450 | 544 |
| Rushing yards | 115 | 109 |
| Passing yards | 335 | 435 |
| Turnovers | 2 | 1 |
| Time of possession | 37:41 | 22:18 |

| Team | Category | Player | Statistics |
|---|---|---|---|
| Texas A&M | Passing | Kellen Mond | 25–44, 318 yards, 3 TDs, 1 INT |
| Texas A&M | Rushing | Haynes King | 5 carries, 43 yards |
| Texas A&M | Receiving | Ainias Smith | 6 receptions, 123 yards, 2 TDs |
| Alabama | Passing | Mac Jones | 20–27, 435 yards, 4 TDs, 1 INT |
| Alabama | Rushing | Brian Robinson Jr. | 10 carries, 60 yards |
| Alabama | Receiving | John Metchie III | 5 receptions, 181 yards, 2 TDs |

=== At Ole Miss Rebels ===
| Team | 1 | 2 | 3 | 4 | Total |
|---|---|---|---|---|---|
| • No. 2 Alabama | 7 | 14 | 21 | 21 | 63 |
| Ole Miss | 7 | 14 | 14 | 13 | 48 |

- Date: October 10
- Location: Oxford, MS
- Game start: 6:40 p.m.
- Game attendance: 14,419
- Game weather: 68, Clear, Wind NE @ 1 mph
- Referee: Matt Loeffler
- TV announcers (ESPN): Sean McDonough (play-by-play), Todd Blackledge (color), Todd McShay and Molly McGrath (sideline)

| Statistics | Alabama | Ole Miss |
|---|---|---|
| First downs | 37 | 31 |
| Total yards | 723 | 647 |
| Rushing yards | 306 | 268 |
| Passing yards | 417 | 379 |
| Turnovers | 1 | 0 |
| Time of possession | 28:45 | 31:15 |

| Team | Category | Player | Statistics |
|---|---|---|---|
| Alabama | Passing | Mac Jones | 28–32, 417 yards, 2 TD's |
| Alabama | Rushing | Najee Harris | 23 carries, 206 yards, 5 TD's |
| Alabama | Receiving | DeVonta Smith | 13 receptions, 164 yards, 1 TD |
| Ole Miss | Passing | Matt Corral | 21–28, 365 yards, 2 TD's |
| Ole Miss | Rushing | Snoop Conner | 21 carries, 128 yards, 2 TD's |
| Ole Miss | Receiving | Kenny Yeboah | 7 receptions, 181 yards, 2 TD's |

=== No. 3 Georgia Bulldogs ===
| Team | 1 | 2 | 3 | 4 | Total |
|---|---|---|---|---|---|
| No. 3 Georgia | 7 | 17 | 0 | 0 | 24 |
| • No. 2 Alabama | 7 | 13 | 14 | 7 | 41 |

- Date: October 17
- Location: Tuscaloosa, AL
- Game start: 7:10 p.m.
- Game attendance: 19,424
- Game weather: 61, Clear skies, Wind ESE @ 4 mph
- Referee: Ken Williamson
- TV announcers (CBS): Brad Nessler (play-by-play), Gary Danielson (color), Jamie Erdahl (sideline)

| Statistics | Georgia | Alabama |
|---|---|---|
| First downs | 20 | 33 |
| Total yards | 414 | 564 |
| Rushing yards | 145 | 147 |
| Passing yards | 269 | 417 |
| Turnovers | 3 | 1 |
| Time of possession | 26:01 | 33:59 |

| Team | Category | Player | Statistics |
|---|---|---|---|
| Georgia | Passing | Stetson Bennett | 18–40, 269 yards, 2 TD's, 3 INT's |
| Georgia | Rushing | Zamir White | 10 carries, 57 yards, 1 TD |
| Georgia | Receiving | James Cook | 4 receptions, 101 yards, 1 TD |
| Alabama | Passing | Mac Jones | 24–32, 417 yards, 4 TD's, 1 INT |
| Alabama | Rushing | Najee Harris | 31 carries, 152 yards, 1 TD |
| Alabama | Receiving | DeVonta Smith | 11 receptions, 167 yards, 2 TD's |

=== At Tennessee Volunteers ===
Third Saturday in October

| Team | 1 | 2 | 3 | 4 | Total |
|---|---|---|---|---|---|
| • No. 2 Alabama | 14 | 14 | 14 | 6 | 48 |
| Tennessee | 0 | 10 | 7 | 0 | 17 |

- Date: October 24
- Location: Knoxville, TN
- Game start: 3:39 p.m.
- Game attendance: 23,394
- Game weather: 72, Mostly cloudy, Wind N @ 7 mph
- Referee: Alex Moore
- TV announcers (CBS): Brad Nessler (play-by-play), Gary Danielson (color), Jamie Erdahl (sideline)

| Statistics | Alabama | Tennessee |
|---|---|---|
| First downs | 30 | 16 |
| Total yards | 587 | 302 |
| Rushing yards | 170 | 139 |
| Passing yards | 417 | 163 |
| Turnovers | 1 | 1 |
| Time of possession | 34:38 | 25:22 |

| Team | Category | Player | Statistics |
|---|---|---|---|
| Alabama | Passing | Mac Jones | 25–31, 387 yards |
| Alabama | Rushing | Najee Harris | 20 carries, 96 yards, 3 TD's |
| Alabama | Receiving | John Metchie III | 7 receptions, 151 yards |
| Tennessee | Passing | Jarrett Guarantano | 13–24, 162 yards, 2 TD's |
| Tennessee | Rushing | Eric Gray | 19 carries, 57 yards |
| Tennessee | Receiving | Jalin Hyatt | 2 receptions, 86 yards, 1 TD |

=== Mississippi State Bulldogs ===
| Team | 1 | 2 | 3 | 4 | Total |
|---|---|---|---|---|---|
| Miss State | 0 | 0 | 0 | 0 | 0 |
| • No. 2 Alabama | 17 | 10 | 0 | 14 | 41 |

- Date: October 31
- Location: Tuscaloosa, AL
- Game start: 6:05 p.m.
- Game attendance: 19,424
- Game weather: 66, Partly cloudy skies, Wind ESE @ 6 mph
- Referee: Jason Autrey
- TV announcers (ESPN): Sean McDonough (play-by-play), Todd Blackledge (color), Todd McShay and Molly McGrath (sideline)

Statistics

| Statistics | Miss State | Alabama |
|---|---|---|
| First downs | 12 | 26 |
| Total yards | 200 | 499 |
| Rushing yards | 37 | 208 |
| Passing yards | 163 | 291 |
| Turnovers | 3 | 1 |
| Time of possession | 28:18 | 31:42 |

| Team | Category | Player | Statistics |
|---|---|---|---|
| Miss State | Passing | Will Rogers | 24–37, 147 yards, 2 INT's |
| Miss State | Rushing | Jo'Quavious Marks | 9 carries, 32 yards |
| Miss State | Receiving | Jo'Quavious Marks | 8 receptions, 38 yards |
| Alabama | Passing | Mac Jones | 24–31, 291 yards, 4 TD's |
| Alabama | Rushing | Najee Harris | 21 carries, 119 yards |
| Alabama | Receiving | DeVonta Smith | 11 receptions, 203 yards, 4 TD's |

=== Kentucky Wildcats ===
| Team | 1 | 2 | 3 | 4 | Total |
|---|---|---|---|---|---|
| Kentucky | 3 | 0 | 0 | 0 | 3 |
| • No. 1 Alabama | 7 | 21 | 21 | 14 | 63 |

- Date: November 21
- Location: Tuscaloosa, AL
- Game start: 3:01 p.m.
- Game attendance: 19,424
- Game weather: 73, Partly cloudy skies, Wind ESE @ 3 mph
- Referee: Ken Williamson
- TV announcers (SEC Network): Tom Hart (play-by-play), Jordan Rodgers (color), Cole Cubelic (sideline)

| Statistics | Kentucky | Alabama |
|---|---|---|
| First downs | 12 | 29 |
| Total yards | 179 | 509 |
| Rushing yards | 59 | 226 |
| Passing yards | 120 | 283 |
| Turnovers | 1 | 1 |
| Time of possession | 28:55 | 31:05 |

| Team | Category | Player | Statistics |
|---|---|---|---|
| Kentucky | Passing | Terry Wilson | 10–19, 120 yards, 1 INT |
| Kentucky | Rushing | A. J. Rose | 10 carries, 68 yards |
| Kentucky | Receiving | Josh Ali | 4 receptions, 52 yards |
| Alabama | Passing | Mac Jones | 16–24, 230 yards, 2 TD's, 1 INT |
| Alabama | Rushing | Jase McClellan | 10 carries, 99 yards, 1 TD |
| Alabama | Receiving | DeVonta Smith | 9 receptions, 144 yards, 2 TD's |

=== No. 22 Auburn Tigers ===
Steve Sarkisian served as interim head coach for the Iron Bowl after Nick Saban had to be quarantined due to COVID-19 protocols.

Iron Bowl

| Team | 1 | 2 | 3 | 4 | Total |
|---|---|---|---|---|---|
| No. 22 Auburn | 0 | 3 | 3 | 7 | 13 |
| • No. 1 Alabama | 7 | 14 | 14 | 7 | 42 |

- Date: November 28
- Location: Tuscaloosa, AL
- Game start: 2:39 p.m.
- Game attendance: 19,424
- Game weather: 63, Partly Cloudy, Wind N @ 6 mph
- Referee: Jason Autrey
- TV announcers (CBS): Brad Nessler (play-by-play), Gary Danielson (color), Jamie Erdahl (sideline)

| Statistics | Auburn | Alabama |
|---|---|---|
| First downs | 20 | 20 |
| Total yards | 347 | 445 |
| Rushing yards | 120 | 143 |
| Passing yards | 227 | 302 |
| Turnovers | 2 | 1 |
| Time of possession | 36:30 | 23:30 |

| Team | Category | Player | Statistics |
|---|---|---|---|
| Auburn | Passing | Bo Nix | 23–38, 227 yards, 2 INT's |
| Auburn | Rushing | Mark-Antony Richards | 14 carries, 57 yards |
| Auburn | Receiving | Anthony Schwartz | 5 receptions, 60 yards |
| Alabama | Passing | Mac Jones | 18–26, 302 yards, 5 TD's |
| Alabama | Rushing | Najee Harris | 11 carries, 96 yards, 1 TD |
| Alabama | Receiving | DeVonta Smith | 7 receptions, 171 yards, 2 TD's |

=== At LSU Tigers ===
| Team | 1 | 2 | 3 | 4 | Total |
|---|---|---|---|---|---|
| • No. 1 Alabama | 21 | 24 | 7 | 3 | 55 |
| LSU | 0 | 14 | 3 | 0 | 17 |

- Date: December 5
- Location: Baton Rouge, LA
- Game start: 7:10 p.m.
- Game attendance: 22,349
- Game weather: 73, Clear, Wind S @ 3 mph
- Referee: Alex Moore
- TV announcers (CBS): Brad Nessler (play-by-play), Gary Danielson (color), Jamie Erdahl (sideline)

| Statistics | Alabama | LSU |
|---|---|---|
| First downs | 32 | 21 |
| Total yards | 650 | 352 |
| Rushing yards | 265 | 98 |
| Passing yards | 385 | 254 |
| Turnovers | 1 | 1 |
| Time of possession | 33:17 | 26:43 |

| Team | Category | Player | Statistics |
|---|---|---|---|
| Alabama | Passing | Mac Jones | 20–28, 385 yards, 4 TD's |
| Alabama | Rushing | Najee Harris | 21 carries, 145 yards, 3 TD's |
| Alabama | Receiving | DeVonta Smith | 8 receptions, 231 yards, 3 TD's |
| LSU | Passing | T. J. Finley | 14–28, 144 yards, 1 TD |
| LSU | Rushing | John Emery | 7 carries, 79 yards, 1 TD |
| LSU | Receiving | Kayshon Boutte | 8 receptions, 111 yards |

=== At Arkansas Razorbacks ===
| Team | 1 | 2 | 3 | 4 | Total |
|---|---|---|---|---|---|
| • No. 1 Alabama | 10 | 28 | 7 | 7 | 52 |
| Arkansas | 3 | 0 | 0 | 0 | 3 |

- Date: December 12
- Location: Fayetteville, AR
- Game start: 11:02 a.m.
- Game attendance: 16,500
- Game weather: 36, Overcast, Wind SSW @ 4 mph
- Referee: Ken Williamson
- TV announcers (ESPN): Bob Wischusen (play-by-play), Dan Orlovsky (color), Kris Budden (sideline)

| Statistics | Alabama | Arkansas |
|---|---|---|
| First downs | 24 | 13 |
| Total yards | 443 | 188 |
| Rushing yards | 216 | 80 |
| Passing yards | 227 | 108 |
| Turnovers | 1 | 4 |
| Time of possession | 33:15 | 26:45 |

| Team | Category | Player | Statistics |
|---|---|---|---|
| Alabama | Passing | Mac Jones | 24–29, 208 yards |
| Alabama | Rushing | Jase McClellan | 6 carries, 95 yards, 1 TD |
| Alabama | Receiving | John Metchie III | 5 receptions, 72 yards |
| Arkansas | Passing | Feleipe Franks | 8–10, 90 yards |
| Arkansas | Rushing | Trelon Smith | 19 carries, 69 yards |
| Arkansas | Receiving | Michael Woods II | 3 receptions, 43 yards |

=== Vs. No. 7 Florida Gators ===
2020 SEC Championship Game

| Team | 1 | 2 | 3 | 4 | Total |
|---|---|---|---|---|---|
| • No. 1 Alabama | 14 | 21 | 0 | 17 | 52 |
| No. 7 Florida | 10 | 7 | 14 | 15 | 46 |

- Date: December 19
- Location: Atlanta, GA
- Game start: 8:10 p.m.
- Game attendance: 16,520
- Game weather: Indoors
- Referee: Matt Loeffler
- TV announcers (CBS): Brad Nessler (play-by-play), Gary Danielson (color), Jamie Erdahl (sideline)

| Statistics | Alabama | Florida |
|---|---|---|
| First downs | 33 | 26 |
| Total yards | 605 | 462 |
| Rushing yards | 187 | 54 |
| Passing yards | 418 | 408 |
| Turnovers | 1 | 2 |
| Time of possession | 34:21 | 25:39 |

| Team | Category | Player | Statistics |
|---|---|---|---|
| Alabama | Passing | Mac Jones | 33–43, 418 yards, 5 TD's, 1 INT |
| Alabama | Rushing | Najee Harris | 31 carries, 178 yards, 2 TD's |
| Alabama | Receiving | DeVonta Smith | 15 receptions, 184 yards, 2 TD's |
| Florida | Passing | Kyle Trask | 26–40, 408 yards, 3 TD's |
| Florida | Rushing | Emory Jones | 2 carries, 24 yards |
| Florida | Receiving | Kadarius Toney | 8 receptions, 153 yards, 1 TD |

=== Vs. No. 4 Notre Dame Fighting Irish ===
Rose Bowl- CFP Semifinal

| Team | 1 | 2 | 3 | 4 | Total |
|---|---|---|---|---|---|
| No. 4 Notre Dame | 0 | 7 | 0 | 7 | 14 |
| • No. 1 Alabama | 14 | 7 | 7 | 3 | 31 |

- Date: January 1, 2021
- Location: Arlington, TX
- Game start: 3:20 p.m.
- Game attendance: 18,373
- Game weather: Indoors
- Referee: John O’Neill
- TV announcers (ESPN): Sean McDonough (play-by-play), Todd Blackledge (color), Todd McShay & Allison Williams (sideline)

| Statistics | Notre Dame | Alabama |
|---|---|---|
| First downs | 24 | 24 |
| Total yards | 375 | 437 |
| Rushing yards | 139 | 140 |
| Passing yards | 236 | 297 |
| Turnovers | 1 | 0 |
| Time of possession | 33:43 | 26:17 |

| Team | Category | Player | Statistics |
|---|---|---|---|
| Notre Dame | Passing | Ian Book | 27–39, 229 yards, 1 INT |
| Notre Dame | Rushing | Kyren Williams | 16 carries, 64 yards, 1 TD |
| Notre Dame | Receiving | Michael Mayer | 7 receptions, 62 yards |
| Alabama | Passing | Mac Jones | 25–30, 297 yards, 4 TD's |
| Alabama | Rushing | Najee Harris | 15 carries, 125 yards |
| Alabama | Receiving | DeVonta Smith | 7 receptions, 130 yards, 3 TD's |

=== Vs. No. 3 Ohio State Buckeyes ===
CFP National Championship

| Team | 1 | 2 | 3 | 4 | Total |
|---|---|---|---|---|---|
| No. 3 Ohio State | 7 | 10 | 7 | 0 | 24 |
| • No. 1 Alabama | 7 | 28 | 10 | 7 | 52 |

- Date: January 11, 2021
- Location: Miami Gardens, FL
- Game start: 8:15 p.m.
- Game attendance: 14,926
- Game weather: 69, Fair, Wind SW @ 3 mph
- Referee: Brandon Cruse
- TV announcers (ESPN): Chris Fowler (play-by-play), Kirk Herbstreit (color), Maria Taylor & Allison Williams (sideline)

| Statistics | Ohio State | Alabama |
|---|---|---|
| First downs | 19 | 33 |
| Total yards | 341 | 621 |
| Rushing yards | 147 | 157 |
| Passing yards | 194 | 464 |
| Turnovers | 0 | 1 |
| Time of possession | 22:34 | 37:26 |

| Team | Category | Player | Statistics |
|---|---|---|---|
| Ohio State | Passing | Justin Fields | 17–33, 194 yards, 1 TD |
| Ohio State | Rushing | Justin Fields | 6 carries, 67 yards |
| Ohio State | Receiving | Chris Olave | 8 receptions, 69 yards |
| Alabama | Passing | Mac Jones | 36–45, 464 yards, 5 TD's |
| Alabama | Rushing | Najee Harris | 22 carries, 79 yards, 2 TD's |
| Alabama | Receiving | DeVonta Smith | 12 receptions, 215 yards, 3 TD's |

== Rankings ==
Ranking movements Legend: ██ Increase in ranking ██ Decrease in ranking ( ) = First-place votes
| | Week | | | | | | | | | | | | | | | | | |
| Poll | Pre | 1 | 2 | 3 | 4 | 5 | 6 | 7 | 8 | 9 | 10 | 11 | 12 | 13 | 14 | 15 | 16 | Final |
|---|---|---|---|---|---|---|---|---|---|---|---|---|---|---|---|---|---|---|
| AP | 3 (2) | 3* | 2 | 2 (1) | 2 (3) | 2 (8) | 2 (2) | 2 (8) | 2 (10) | 2 (29) | 1 (59) | 1 (60) | 1 (62) | 1 (62) | 1 (62) | 1 (62) | 1 (62) | 1 (61) |
| Coaches | 3 (4) | 3* | 2 (1) | 2 (1) | 2 (4) | 2 (14) | 2 (5) | 2 (8) | 2 (8) | 2 (17) | 1 (55) | 1 (57) | 1 (59) | 1 (59) | 1 (59) | 1 (60) | 1 (61) | 1 (60) |
| CFP | Not released | | | | | | | | | | | | 1 | 1 | 1 | 1 | 1 | Not released |

== Statistics ==
=== Scoring ===
==== Scores by quarter (non-conference opponents) ====
| | 1 | 2 | 3 | 4 | Total |
|---|---|---|---|---|---|
| All opponents | 7 | 17 | 7 | 7 | 38 |
| Alabama | 21 | 35 | 17 | 10 | 83 |

==== Scores by quarter (SEC opponents) ====
| | 1 | 2 | 3 | 4 | Total |
|---|---|---|---|---|---|
| SEC opponents | 37 | 75 | 47 | 55 | 214 |
| Alabama | 132 | 194 | 112 | 109 | 547 |

==== Scores by quarter (All opponents) ====
| | 1 | 2 | 3 | 4 | Total |
|---|---|---|---|---|---|
| All opponents | 44 | 92 | 54 | 62 | 252 |
| Alabama | 153 | 229 | 129 | 119 | 630 |

== Awards and honors ==
DeVonta Smith

- Heisman Trophy
- Maxwell Award
- Walter Camp Award
- Fred Biletnikoff Award
- Paul Hornung Award
- Associated Press College Football Player of the Year
- Sporting News College Football Player of the Year
- SEC Offensive Player of the Year

Mac Jones

- Davey O’Brien Award
- Johnny Unitas Golden Arm Award
- Manning Award

Najee Harris

- Doak Walker Award

Alex Leatherwood

- Outland Trophy
- Jacobs Blocking Trophy

Landon Dickerson

- Rimington Trophy
- Jacobs Blocking Trophy

Thomas Fletcher

- Patrick Mannelly Award

Patrick Surtain II

- SEC Defensive Player of the Year

Offensive line

- Joe Moore Award

John Metchie III

- Jon Cornish Trophy

=== Coaches ===
Nick Saban

- Paul “Bear” Bryant Award

Steve Sarkisian

- Broyles Award

== All Americans ==
Unanimous Selection

- Najee Harris (AFCA, AP, CBS, ESPN, FWAA, Phil Steele, TSN, WCFF)
- DeVonta Smith (AFCA, AP, Athletic, CBS, ESPN, FWAA, Phil Steele, TSN, USAT, WCFF)
- Landon Dickerson (AFCA, AP, CBS, ESPN, FWAA, Phil Steele, TSN, WCFF)
- Alex Leatherwood (AFCA, AP, Athletic, CBS, ESPN, FWAA, Phil Steele, TSN, USAT, WCFF)
- Patrick Surtain II (AFCA, AP, Athletic, CBS, ESPN, FWAA, Phil Steele, TSN, USAT, WCFF)

Consensus Selection

- Mac Jones (AFCA, AP, Athletic, ESPN, TSN, USAT, WCFF)

Other Selections

- Will Reichard (CBS)
- Thomas Fletcher (Phil Steele)

== All-SEC ==
First Team

QB- Mac Jones

RB- Najee Harris

WR- DeVonta Smith

C- Landon Dickerson

OL- Alex Leatherwood

DT- Christian Barmore

CB- Patrick Surtain II

Second Team

OL- Deonte Brown (AP: 2, Coaches: 1)

LB- Dylan Moses (Coaches: 1)

LB- Christopher Allen (Coaches: 2)

LB- Will Anderson Jr. (AP: 2)

DB- Malachi Moore

KR- Jaylen Waddle (Coaches: 2)

== Players drafted into the NFL ==
| Round | Pick | Player | Position | NFL Club |
|---|---|---|---|---|
| 1 | 6 | Jaylen Waddle | WR | Miami Dolphins |
| 1 | 9 | Patrick Surtain II | CB | Denver Broncos |
| 1 | 10 | DeVonta Smith | WR | Philadelphia Eagles |
| 1 | 15 | Mac Jones | QB | New England Patriots |
| 1 | 17 | Alex Leatherwood | OT | Las Vegas Raiders |
| 1 | 24 | Najee Harris | RB | Pittsburgh Steelers |
| 2 | 37 | Landon Dickerson | C | Philadelphia Eagles |
| 2 | 38 | Christian Barmore | DT | New England Patriots |
| 6 | 193 | Deonte Brown | OG | Carolina Panthers |
| 6 | 222 | Thomas Fletcher | LS | Carolina Panthers |

== Media affiliates ==
=== Radio ===
- WTID (FM) (Tide 102.9) – Nationwide (Dish Network, SiriusXM, TuneIn radio and iHeartRadio)

=== TV ===
- CBS Family – CBS 42 (CBS), CBS Sports Network
- ESPN/ABC Family – ABC 33/40 (ABC), ABC, ESPN, ESPN2, ESPNU, ESPN+, SEC Network)
- FOX Family – WBRC (FOX), FOX/FS1, FSN
- NBC – WVTM-TV, NBC Sports, NBCSN
