= Landon Dickerson =

American football player (born 1998)

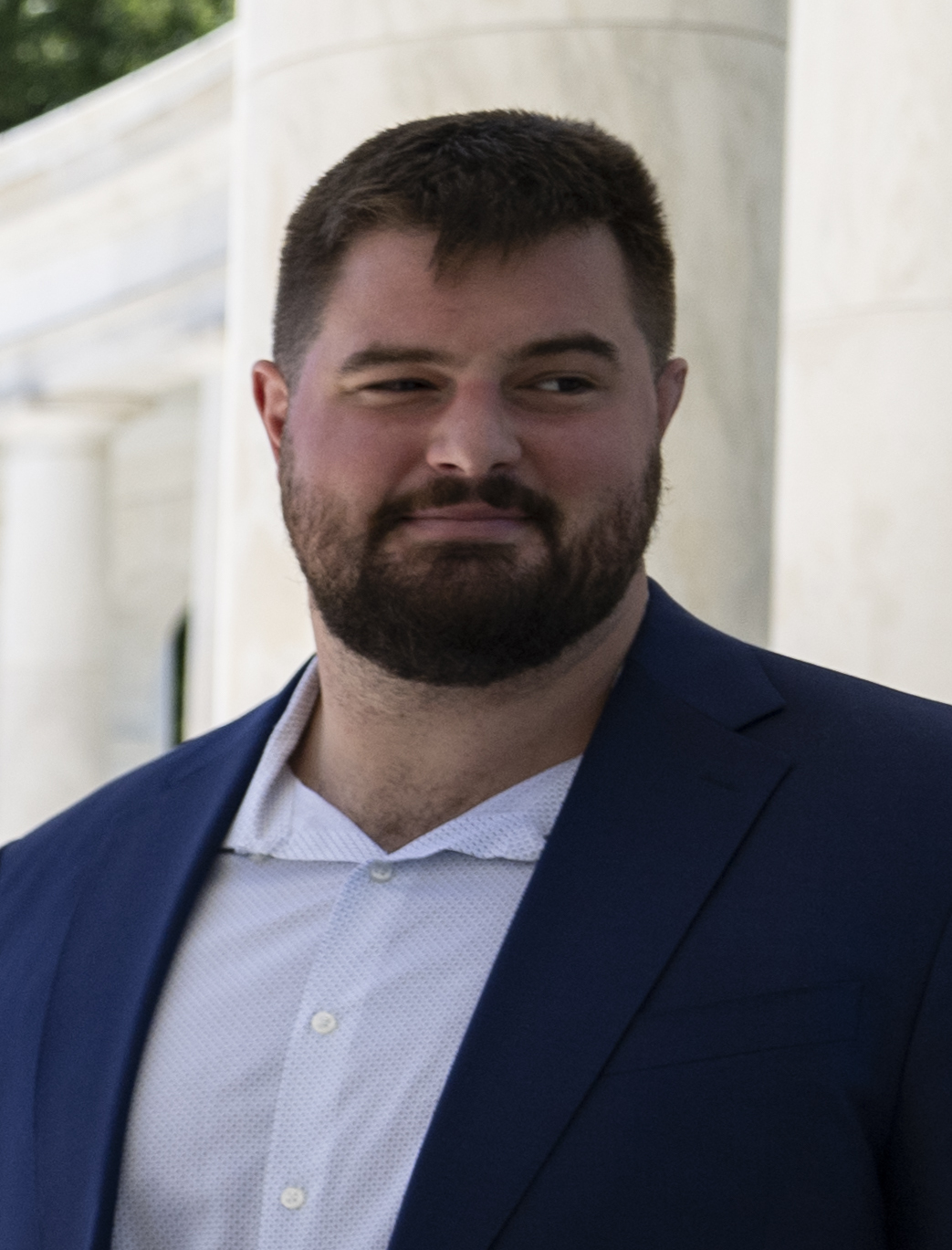
- Dickerson in 2025

No. 69 – Philadelphia Eagles
- Position: Offensive guard
- Roster status: Active

Personal information
- Born: September 30, 1998 (age 28); Hickory, North Carolina, U.S.
- Listed height: 6 ft 6 in (1.98 m)
- Listed weight: 332 lb (151 kg)

Career information
- High school: South Caldwell (Hudson, North Carolina)
- College: Florida State (2016–2018); Alabama (2019–2020)
- NFL draft: 2021: 2nd round, 37th overall pick

Career history
- Philadelphia Eagles (2021–present)

Awards and highlights
- Super Bowl champion (LIX); 3× Pro Bowl (2022–2024); CFP national champion (2020); Rimington Trophy (2020); Unanimous All-American (2020); Jacobs Blocking Trophy (2020) (Note: Co-winner with Alex Leatherwood); First-team All-SEC (2020); Second-team All-SEC (2019)

Career NFL statistics as of Week 9, 2026
- Games played: 82
- Games started: 81
- Stats at Pro Football Reference

Landon Marshall Dickerson (born September 30, 1998) is an American professional football guard for the Philadelphia Eagles of the National Football League (NFL). He played college football as a center for the Florida State Seminoles and the Alabama Crimson Tide, and was selected by the Eagles in the second round of the 2021 NFL draft.

== Early life ==
Dickerson grew up in Hickory, North Carolina, attending Hickory High School and then South Caldwell High School. He was named first-team All-State and played in the Under Armour All-America Game as a high school senior. Dickerson was rated a four-star recruit entering college and committed to Florida State over offers from Virginia Tech, Tennessee, Georgia, and Auburn. He is also an Eagle Scout, earning the rank in 2016 in the Piedmont Council.

== College career ==
=== Florida State ===
Dickerson began his collegiate career at Florida State. He was named the Seminoles' starter at right guard during training camp and became the first true freshman offensive lineman to start a season opener since Jamie Dukes in 1982. He started the first seven games of the season before suffering a season-ending knee injury. He started the first four games of his sophomore season before missing the rest of the season due to injury. He used a medical redshirt after sustaining an ankle injury two games into his junior year. Following the end of the season, Dickerson entered the transfer portal. He eventually opted to transfer to Alabama as a graduate transfer, having earned his undergraduate degree from Florida State, for his final two seasons of NCAA eligibility.

=== Alabama ===
Dickerson was named the Crimson Tide's starting right guard going into his first season with the team. After four games, he was moved to center, despite having never played the position at any level; he started the final nine games of the season and was named second-team All-Southeastern Conference (SEC).

Dickerson started the first 11 games of the season for the Crimson Tide as a redshirt senior before suffering ligament damage in his right knee against Florida in the 2020 SEC Championship Game. He was named first-team All-SEC and was the co-winner of the Jacobs Blocking Trophy along with Alabama teammate Alex Leatherwood. Dickerson was a unanimous All-America selection and was awarded the Rimington Trophy as the nation's best center. Despite suffering what was considered to be a season ending injury, he dressed for the 2021 College Football Playoff National Championship game entering the game for the final snap in Alabama's 52-24 win over Ohio State.

== Professional career ==
Pre-draft measurables
Height	Weight	Arm length	Hand span	Wingspan
6 ft 5 5/8 in (1.97 m)	333 lb (151 kg)	33 1/4 in (0.84 m)	10 3/8 in (0.26 m)	6 ft 9 1/8 in (2.06 m)
All values from Pro Day

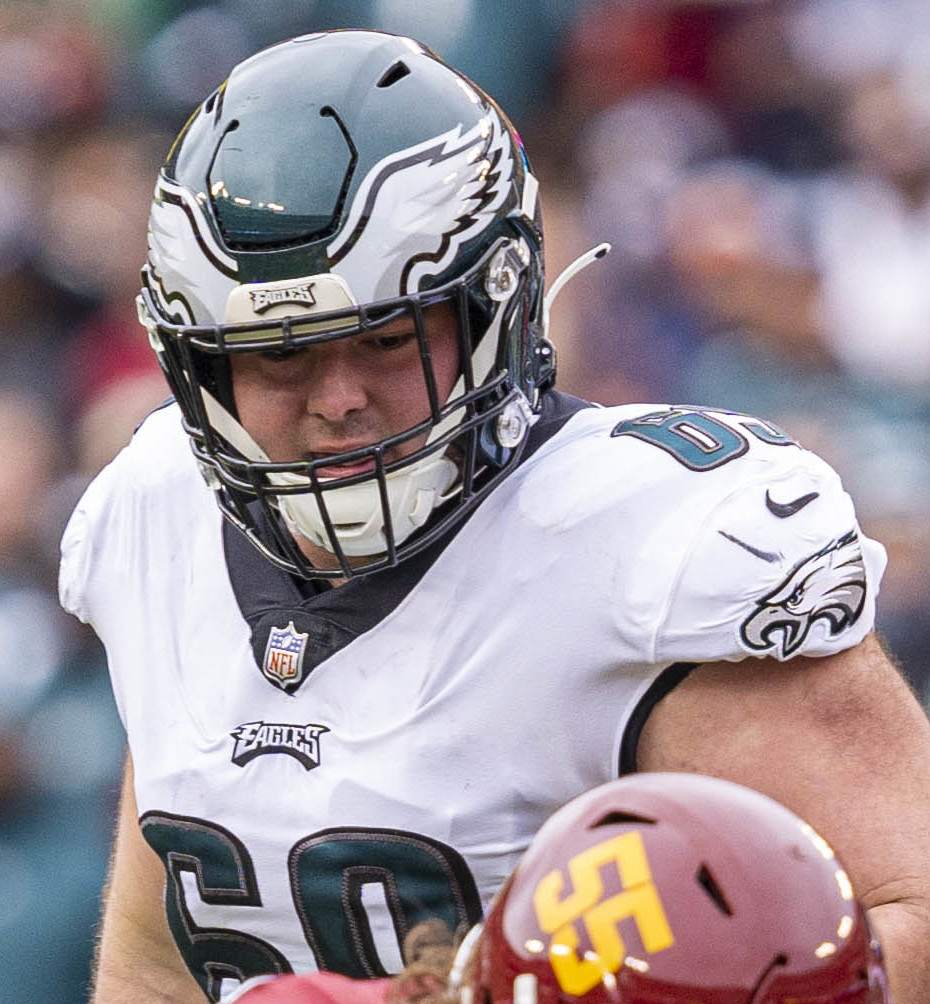
Dickerson with the Eagles in 2022

The Philadelphia Eagles selected Dickerson in the second round, with the 37th overall pick, of the 2021 NFL draft. On July 26, 2021, Dickerson signed his four-year rookie contract with the Eagles.

Following an injury to Isaac Seumalo in week three of the 2021 season, Dickerson took over as the starting left guard for the Eagles. He was placed on the COVID list on December 20; it caused him to miss a Tuesday night game that had been delayed due to an outbreak of the virus on the Washington Football Team roster. He was activated off of the COVID list on December 24, 2021.

On December 21, 2022, Dickerson was selected to his first Pro Bowl, alongside linemates Lane Johnson and Jason Kelce, as the Eagles stood at a 13–1 record. Dickerson helped the Eagles win a franchise record 14 games and reach Super Bowl LVII where they lost 38–35 to the Kansas City Chiefs.

On March 11, 2024, Dickerson signed a four-year, $84 million contract extension with the Eagles, making him the highest-paid guard in NFL history. He won a Super Bowl championship when the Eagles defeated the Kansas City Chiefs 40–22 in Super Bowl LIX.

On September 14, 2026, Dickerson was placed on injured reserve by Philadelphia, having aggravated a knee injury during the team's season–opening win over the Washington Commanders.
