= Thomas Fletcher (American football) =

American football player (born 1998)

Youngstown State Penguins
- Title: Special teams coordinator

Personal information
- Born: October 1, 1998 (age 28); Georgetown, Texas, U.S.
- Listed height: 6 ft 1 in (1.85 m)
- Listed weight: 235 lb (107 kg)

Career information
- Position: Long snapper
- High school: IMG Academy (Bradenton, Florida)
- College: Alabama (2017–2020)
- NFL draft: 2021: 6th round, 222nd overall pick

Career history

Playing
- Carolina Panthers (2021); Seattle Sea Dragons (2023)

Coaching
- Florida (2023–2024) Graduate assistant; West Alabama (2025) Special teams coordinator & tight ends coach; Youngstown State (2026–present) Special teams coordinator & tight ends coach

Awards and highlights
- 2× CFP national champion (2017, 2020); Patrick Mannelly Award (2020)
- Stats at Pro Football Reference

Thomas Fletcher (born October 1, 1998) is an American former professional football long snapper who is the special teams coordinator for the Youngstown State. He played college football at Alabama, where he won the Patrick Mannelly Award in 2020. Fletcher was selected by the Carolina Panthers in the sixth round of the 2021 NFL draft, but missed his rookie season due to a hip injury and was waived prior to the 2022 season. He was previously a special teams graduate assistant for the Florida Gators.

== College career ==
Fletcher played for University of Alabama from 2017 to 2020. He was a four-year starter playing in 55 games over the course of his college career. While at Alabama, Fletcher won two CFP national championships. He also won the Patrick Mannelly Award as college football's top long snapper in 2020.

== Professional career ==
Pre-draft measurables
Height	Weight	Arm length	Hand span	40-yard dash	10-yard split	20-yard split	20-yard shuttle	Three-cone drill	Vertical jump	Broad jump	Bench press
6 ft 0 3/4 in (1.85 m)	235 lb (107 kg)	30 3/4 in (0.78 m)	9 1/2 in (0.24 m)	4.92 s	1.74 s	2.92 s	4.58 s	7.65 s	33.5 in (0.85 m)	9 ft 1 in (2.77 m)	13 reps
All values from Pro Day

=== Carolina Panthers ===
Fletcher was drafted by the Carolina Panthers in the sixth round (222nd overall) of the 2021 NFL draft. He signed his four-year rookie contract on May 13, 2021. He suffered a hip injury prior to the regular season and was placed on injured reserve. He was waived on August 4, 2022.

=== Seattle Sea Dragons ===
On November 17, 2022, Fletcher was drafted by the Seattle Sea Dragons of the XFL. The Sea Dragons folded when the XFL and USFL merged to create the United Football League (UFL).

== Coaching career ==
On May 10, 2024, Fletcher announced that he was hired by UF to serve as their special teams assistant.

On January 22, 2024, Fletcher announced that he was hired by UCLA to serve as their special teams assistant.
