= Najee Harris =

American football player (born 1998)

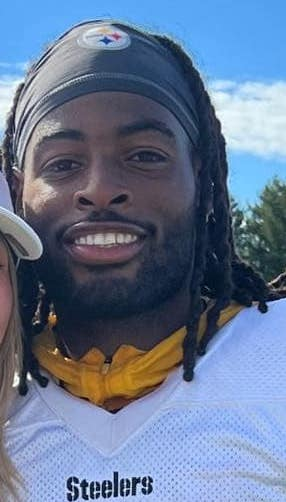
- Harris with the Pittsburgh Steelers in 2022

Profile
- Position: Running back

Personal information
- Born: March 9, 1998 (age 28); Martinez, California, U.S.
- Listed height: 6 ft 1 in (1.85 m)
- Listed weight: 232 lb (105 kg)

Career information
- High school: Antioch (Antioch, California)
- College: Alabama (2017–2020)
- NFL draft: 2021: 1st round, 24th overall pick

Career history
- Pittsburgh Steelers (2021–2024); Los Angeles Chargers (2025); New York Giants (2026)

Awards and highlights
- Pro Bowl (2021); PFWA All-Rookie Team (2021); 2× CFP national champion (2017, 2020); Doak Walker Award (2020); Unanimous All-American (2020); NCAA rushing touchdowns leader (2020); NCAA scoring leader (2020); First-team All-SEC (2020); Second-team All-SEC (2019)

Career NFL statistics as of Week 6, 2026
- Rushing yards: 4,472
- Rushing average: 3.9
- Rushing touchdowns: 28
- Receptions: 184
- Receiving yards: 1,179
- Receiving touchdowns: 6
- Stats at Pro Football Reference

Najee Mzee Harris (/ˈnɑːdʒiː/ NAH-jee; born March 9, 1998) is an American professional football running back. He played college football for the Alabama Crimson Tide and was selected by the Pittsburgh Steelers in the first round of the 2021 NFL draft. Harris has also played for the Los Angeles Chargers and most recently, the New York Giants.

== Early life ==
Harris is from the San Francisco Bay Area. One of five children of a single mother, he grew up in several troubled neighborhoods, including time in a homeless shelter when he was in middle school before the family moved to Antioch. One of his brothers is Bay Area rapper Lil Yee, who survived a shooting in 2025.

Harris played high school football at Antioch High School in Antioch, California. As a sophomore in 2014, Harris rushed for 2,263 yards with 23 touchdowns. As a junior he had 2,744 rushing yards and 36 touchdowns. As a senior, he had 2,776 rushing yards and 34 touchdowns.

=== Recruiting ===
Harris was considered the #1 recruit in the class of 2017, by Scout and Rivals. 247Sports rated him as the No. 2 overall recruit behind Jaelan Phillips while ESPN ranked him the No. 11 overall recruit. Harris received offers from multiple top football programs including the Alabama Crimson Tide, Michigan Wolverines, Ohio State Buckeyes, USC Trojans, and Notre Dame Fighting Irish.

He verbally committed to Alabama in April 2015, but Harris was still undecided between Michigan and Alabama up until the day before spring classes began in January 2017. Alabama quarterback commit Tua Tagovailoa persuaded Harris to join him on his flight to Alabama after the two were roommates for the 2017 U.S. Army All-American Bowl, leading to Harris’ official commitment to the Alabama Crimson Tide.

Harris was one of the most hyped running back recruits since Bryce Brown in 2009 and Leonard Fournette in 2014. Multiple recruiting experts compared him to Adrian Peterson.

College recruiting
| Name | Hometown | School | Height | Weight | Commit date |
|---|---|---|---|---|---|
| Najee Harris; RB | Antioch, CA | Antioch (CA) | 6 ft 3 in (1.91 m) | 226 lb (103 kg) | Apr 18, 2015 |
| Najee Harris; RB | Recruit ratings: Scout: Rivals: 247Sports: (93) | | | | |
Overall recruit ranking: Scout: 1 (RB); 1 (West); 1 (Cal) Rivals: 1 (RB); 1 (Natl); 1 (Cal) 247Sports: 1 (Natl); 1 (RB); 1 (Cal) ESPN: 1 (RB); 1 (West); 1 (Cal)
Note: In many cases, Scout, Rivals, 247Sports, On3, and ESPN may conflict in their listings of height and weight.; In these cases, the average was taken. ESPN grades are on a 100-point scale.; Sources: "Alabama Football Commitments". Rivals.; "2017 Alabama Football Commits". Scout.; "ESPN". ESPN.; "Scout.com Team Recruiting Rankings". Scout.; "2017 Team Ranking". Rivals.com.

== College career ==
Harris played for the University of Alabama from 2017 to 2020 under head coach Nick Saban.

=== 2017 season ===
As a freshman, Harris played in all 14 games but had limited carries as players like Damien Harris, Bo Scarbrough, and Josh Jacobs handled the main workload. Harris finished the season with 370 yards on 61 carries averaging 6.1 yards per carry. He scored three rushing touchdowns on the season. In the national championship against Georgia, Harris had six carries for 64 rushing yards in the 26–23 victory.

=== 2018 season ===
In his sophomore season, Harris was third running back behind Damien Harris and Josh Jacobs. Harris started the season with a rushing touchdown in four of the first five games but did not find the endzone the rest of the season. Harris had his best game against Arkansas State, carrying the ball 13 times and gaining a career-high 135 yards. Harris played in 15 games, recording 783 yards on 117 carries and scoring four rushing touchdowns.

=== 2019 season ===
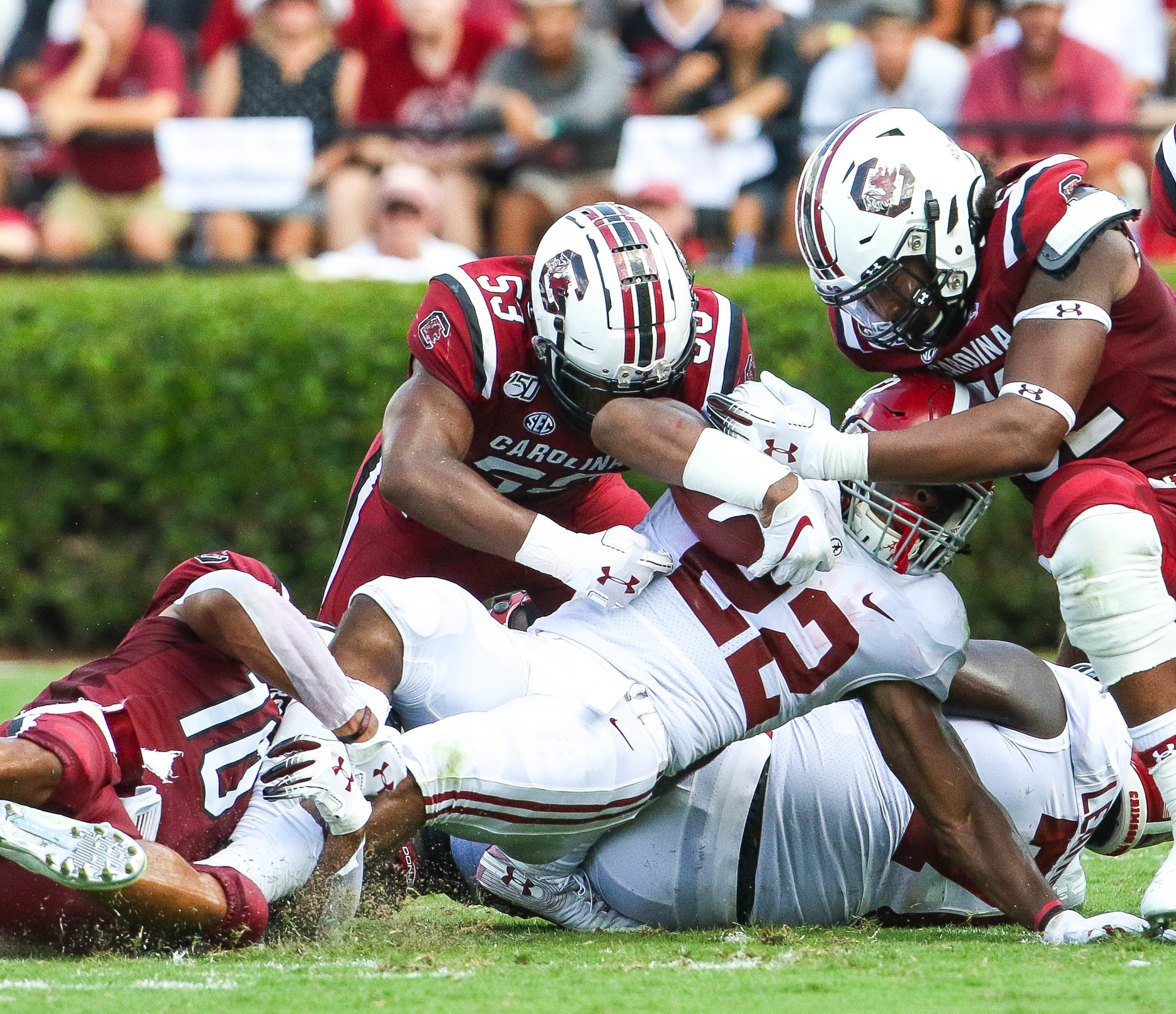
Harris playing against South Carolina in 2019

With Damien Harris and Josh Jacobs off to the NFL, Harris became the starting running back for Alabama Crimson Tide. He and Brian Robinson Jr. largely dominated the backfield production for the Crimson Tide.

On September 14, Harris had two receiving touchdowns in the 47–23 victory over South Carolina. On October 19, against Tennessee in the Third Saturday in October, he had 21 carries for 105 rushing yards and two rushing touchdowns in the 35–13 victory. On November 9, against LSU, he had 19 carries for 146 rushing yards, one rushing touchdown, and one receiving touchdown in the 46–41 loss. In the following game at Mississippi State, Harris had four total touchdowns in the 38–7 victory.

In the Iron Bowl against Auburn, Harris had 27 carries for 146 rushing yards and one rushing touchdown in the 48–45 loss. Alabama finished with a 10–2 record and qualified for the Citrus Bowl. In the Citrus Bowl, Harris had 24 carries for 136 rushing yards and two rushing touchdowns in the 35–16 victory over Michigan.

In the 2019 season, Harris had 209 carries for 1,224 rushing yards and 13 rushing touchdowns while catching 27 passes for 304 receiving yards and seven receiving touchdowns. Despite speculation that he would declare for the 2020 NFL draft, Harris announced that he would return to Alabama for his senior year.

=== 2020 season ===
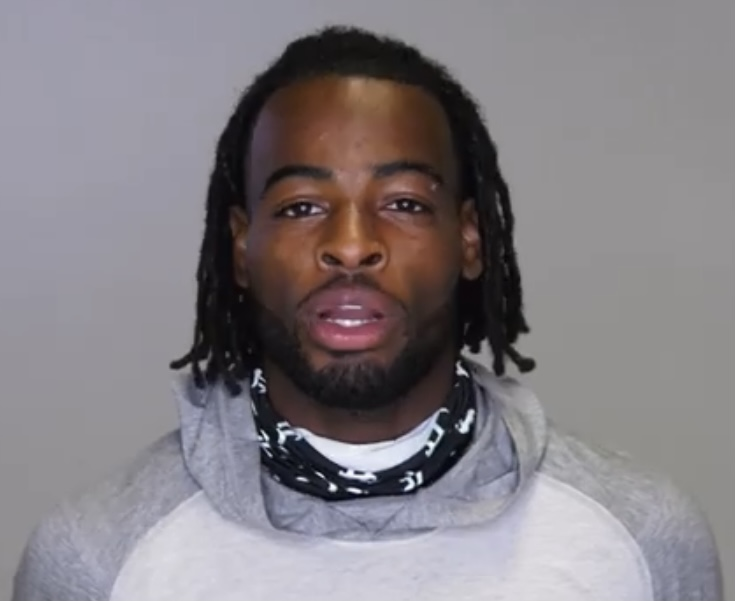
Harris in 2020.

Due to the COVID-19 pandemic in the United States, Alabama's season was cut to an all-conference, ten-game season beginning on September 26. In 2020, Harris was the starting running back for the Alabama Crimson Tide. He and Robinson continued to have a large majority of the backfield carries. In the regular season opener against the Missouri Tigers, Harris had 17 attempts for 98 rushing yards and three rushing touchdowns in the 38–19 victory.

His best game of the season was against Ole Miss, where he attempted 23 rushes for 206 rushing yards with five rushing touchdowns in the 63–48 victory. Against the Georgia Bulldogs he ran for 31 attempts with 152 rushing yards, one rushing touchdown and 4.9 yards on average in the 41–24 victory. In the following game against Tennessee, he had 157 scrimmage yards and three rushing touchdowns in the 48–17 victory. On December 5, against LSU, he had 21 carries for 145 rushing yards and two rushing touchdowns in the 55–17 victory.

In the SEC Championship, he had 245 scrimmage yards (178 rushing, 67 receiving) and five total touchdowns in the 52–46 victory. He finished fifth in Heisman Trophy voting. Alabama went 11–0 and qualified for the College Football Playoff as the #1 seed.

In the Semifinals, the Rose Bowl against Notre Dame, Harris had 15 carries for 125 rushing yards in the 31–14 victory. In the national championship, Harris had 158 scrimmage yards and three total touchdowns in the 52–24 victory over Ohio State to earn his second national championship. He led the NCAA that season in rushing touchdowns (26) and total touchdowns (30).

Harris finished his career as the all-time leader in rushing yards (3,843), total scrimmage yards (4,624) and touchdowns (57) for the Crimson Tide. He was a unanimous All-American and won the Doak Walker Award.

== Professional career ==
Pre-draft measurables
| Height | Weight | Arm length | Hand span | Wingspan |
|---|---|---|---|---|
| 6 ft 1 3/8 in (1.86 m) | 232 lb (105 kg) | 33 1/4 in (0.84 m) | 10 1/4 in (0.26 m) | 6 ft 8 7/8 in (2.05 m) |
All values from Pro Day

=== Pittsburgh Steelers ===
==== 2021 season ====
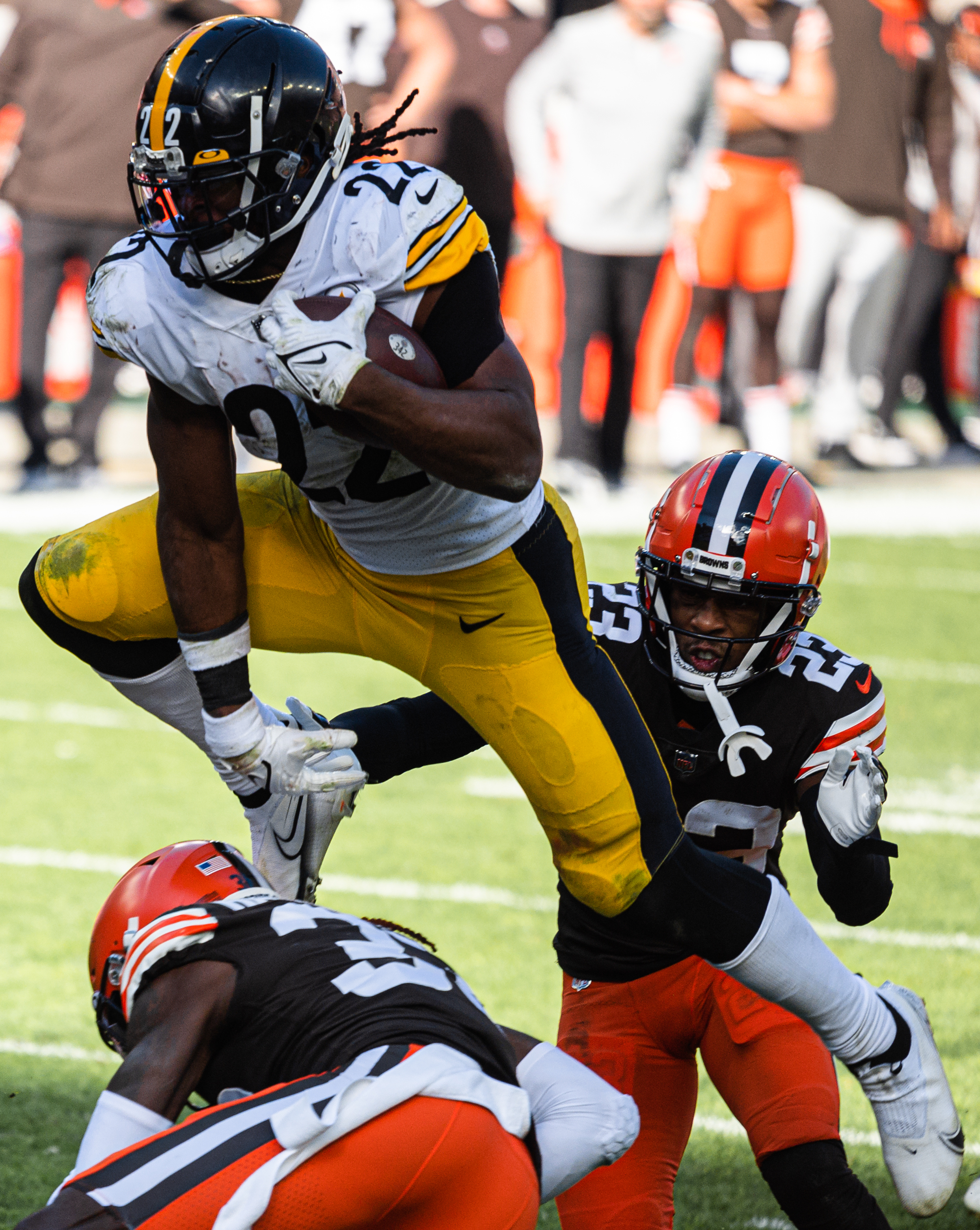
Harris during a game against the Cleveland Browns in 2021.

Harris was selected in the first round with the 24th overall in the 2021 NFL draft by the Pittsburgh Steelers. He was the first running back selected. On May 25, 2021, Harris signed his rookie contract with the Steelers, worth $13.1 million including a $6.9 million signing bonus over four years.

In Week 3 against the Cincinnati Bengals, Harris recorded 142 all-purpose yards, including 14 catches in 19 targets. This tied the NFL record for most catches in a game for a rookie running back, and were the second-highest amount of targets for a running back since 1992 (when the data was first tracked). In Week 5 against the Denver Broncos, Harris recorded 122 yards on 23 carries and a rushing touchdown in the 27–19 win. It marked his first game rushing over 100 yards. He became the first Steelers' rookie to score a rushing touchdown and record 100 yards rushing on his first five games, since Franco Harris in 1972. In Week 17, Harris ran for a career-high 188 yards and the game-sealing touchdown in a 26–14 win over the Cleveland Browns.

Harris finished his rookie season with 1,200 rushing yards and seven touchdowns, and 74 catches for 467 yards and three touchdowns. He finished fourth in rushing yards, fourth in all-purpose yards, and led all running backs in receptions. His 381 touches led the NFL and had zero fumbles. He was selected as an alternate for the 2022 Pro Bowl, replacing Bengals running back Joe Mixon. He was named to the PFWA All-Rookie Team.

==== 2022 season ====
Harris got off to a slow start in 2022. Through the first eight games of the season, he only managed to eclipse 50 rushing yards three times and scored three total touchdowns. It brought into question whether the Lisfranc sprain he suffered in training camp was affecting his production, although Harris claimed that was not the case. Following the team's bye week, he would go on to rush for more than 50 yards in seven of the last nine games and score seven total touchdowns. His best game of the season came in a Week 17 matchup against the Baltimore Ravens. Harris rushed for a season high 111 yards and caught the game winning touchdown from rookie quarterback Kenny Pickett with less than a minute to play.

He finished the 2022 season with 272 carries for 1,038 yards, seven rushing touchdowns, and 41 receptions for 229 yards and three receiving touchdowns. This made Harris the first Steelers player to rush for 1,000 yards in their first two seasons

==== 2023 season ====
In Week 4, Harris had 104 scrimmage yards in a loss to the Houston Texans. In Week 11, Harris would only be able to gain 36 all-purpose yards against division rivals the Cleveland Browns. Harris's frustration with the team's performance began to boil over following the game. Harris seemed to be pessimistic about the season's outlook, stating to reporters in a post-game locker room interview that the poor play was "fixable" but questioned whether or not it would be fixed. The following week would see Harris's best game of the season thus far. Harris had 15 carries for 99 yards with a five-yard rushing touchdown in a 16–10 victory over the Cincinnati Bengals.

In Week 17 against the Seattle Seahawks, Harris had 27 carries for 122 yards and two touchdowns in the 30–23 victory. He capped off the regular season with 26 carries for 112 yards and a touchdown in a 17–10 victory over the Baltimore Ravens. In the 2023 season, Harris rushed 255 times for 1,035 yards and eight touchdowns in 17 games and starts, making him the only running back in franchise history to start their career with three-straight 1,000-yard seasons.

Harris would then make his second post-season appearance of his career in the AFC Wild Card Round against the Buffalo Bills on January 15, 2024. Harris had 12 carries for 37 yards and caught two passes on three targets for 15 yards in the 31–17 Steelers loss. The post-season loss brought Harris's post season statistics to a 0–2 record.

==== 2024 season ====
On May 2, 2024, the Steelers declined the fifth-year option on Harris' contract, making him a free agent after the 2024 season. In Week 1 against the Atlanta Falcons, Harris had 20 carries for just 70 yards, averaging 3.5 yards per carry in the 18–10 Steelers win. On September 29, Harris would have one of the statistically worst games of his career, getting just 13 carries for 19 yards with his longest carry being for five yards. He would also make three catches on six targets for 54 yards. The Steelers would lose 24–27 to the Indianapolis Colts. In the Week 6 win over the Las Vegas Raiders, Harris would score his first touchdown of the season on a 36 yard rush. He would also eclipse 100 rushing yards in a game for the first time since Week 18 of the 2023 season with 106. Harris would hit the century mark again in the following week against the New York Jets, rushing 21 times for 102 yards and, with less than 30 seconds left in the game, another touchdown to seal the win. He finished the 2024 season with 263 carries for 1,043 rushing yards and six rushing touchdowns to go with 36 receptions for 283 receiving yards.

Harris made another postseason start with the Steelers in their 28–14 loss to the Baltimore Ravens during the AFC Wild Card round in which he had six carries for 17 yards.

=== Los Angeles Chargers ===
On March 12, 2025, Harris signed with the Los Angeles Chargers on a one-year, $9.5 million contract. On September 21, in a Week 3 win over the Denver Broncos, Harris tore his Achilles tendon, ending his season.

=== New York Giants ===
On August 18, 2026, Harris signed with the New York Giants on a one-year, $1.22 million contract. On October 18, Harris was named the starting back following fumbling issues by Cam Skattebo. On October 20, he was released. His release came after making comments on his playing time during the loss to the New Orleans Saints, “It's hard to get in a rhythm with one or two plays," Harris said on Sunday. "The first couple runs will be like, 'OK, how are they playing it?' And then the next ones will be, 'OK, this is how you attack it.' But if you're getting a play here and then get taken out for a series, there's nothing you could do. That's why I'm saying, 'I don't know.' I've never been through none of this before."

== Career statistics ==
=== NFL ===
Legend
| **Bold** | Career high |

==== Regular season ====
| Year | Team | Games | | Rushing | | | | | Receiving | | | | | Fumbles | |
| Year | Team | GP | GS | Att | Yds | Y/A | Lng | TD | Rec | Yds | Y/R | Lng | TD | Fum | Lost |
|---|---|---|---|---|---|---|---|---|---|---|---|---|---|---|---|
| 2021 | PIT | 17 | 17 | **307** | **1,200** | 3.9 | **37** | 7 | **74** | **467** | 6.3 | 25 | **3** | 0 | 0 |
| 2022 | PIT | 17 | 17 | 272 | 1,034 | 3.8 | 36 | 7 | 41 | 229 | 5.6 | 19 | **3** | **3** | **2** |
| 2023 | PIT | 17 | 17 | 255 | 1,035 | **4.1** | 25 | **8** | 29 | 170 | 5.9 | **32** | 0 | 2 | 1 |
| 2024 | PIT | 17 | 17 | 263 | 1,043 | 4.0 | 36 | 6 | 36 | 283 | 7.9 | **32** | 0 | 0 | 0 |
| 2025 | LAC | 3 | 0 | 15 | 61 | **4.1** | 7 | 0 | 3 | 25 | **8.3** | 11 | 0 | 0 | 0 |
| 2026 | NYG | 5 | 1 | 31 | 99 | 3.2 | 11 | 0 | 1 | 5 | 5.0 | 5 | 0 | 1 | 0 |
| Career | | 76 | 69 | 1,143 | 4,472 | 3.9 | 37 | 28 | 184 | 1,179 | 6.4 | 32 | 6 | 6 | 3 |

==== Postseason ====
| Year | Team | Games | | Rushing | | | | | Receiving | | | | | Fumbles | |
| Year | Team | GP | GS | Att | Yds | Y/A | Lng | TD | Rec | Yds | Y/R | Lng | TD | Fum | Lost |
|---|---|---|---|---|---|---|---|---|---|---|---|---|---|---|---|
| 2021 | PIT | 1 | 1 | 12 | 29 | 2.4 | 8 | 0 | 2 | −1 | −0.5 | 0 | 0 | **1** | **1** |
| 2023 | PIT | 1 | 1 | 12 | **37** | **3.1** | **11** | 0 | 2 | 15 | 7.5 | 10 | 0 | 0 | 0 |
| 2024 | PIT | 1 | 1 | 6 | 17 | 2.8 | 5 | 0 | **3** | **41** | **13.7** | **21** | 0 | 0 | 0 |
| Career | | 3 | 3 | 30 | 83 | 2.8 | 11 | 0 | 7 | 55 | 7.9 | 21 | 0 | 1 | 1 |

=== College ===
Legend
| | CFP national champion |
| | Led the NCAA |
| **Bold** | Career high |

| Season | Team | GP | Rushing | | | | Receiving | | | | Scrimmage | | | |
| Season | Team | GP | Att | Yds | Avg | TD | Rec | Yds | Avg | TD | Touch | Yds | Avg | TD |
|---|---|---|---|---|---|---|---|---|---|---|---|---|---|---|
| 2017 | Alabama | 10 | 61 | 370 | 6.1 | 3 | 6 | 45 | 7.5 | 0 | 67 | 415 | 6.2 | 4 |
| 2018 | Alabama | **15** | 117 | 783 | **6.7** | 4 | 4 | 7 | 1.8 | 0 | 121 | 790 | **6.5** | 4 |
| 2019 | Alabama | 13 | 209 | 1,224 | 5.9 | 13 | 27 | 304 | **11.3** | **7** | 236 | 1,528 | **6.5** | 20 |
| 2020 | Alabama | 13 | **251** | **1,466** | 5.8 | **26** | **43** | **425** | 9.9 | 4 | **294** | **1,891** | 6.4 | **30** |
| Career | | 51 | 638 | 3,843 | 6.0 | 46 | 80 | 781 | 9.8 | 11 | 718 | 4,624 | 6.4 | 58 |

=== High school ===
| Year | Team | GP | Rushing | | | | Receiving | | | |
| Year | Team | GP | Att | Yds | Avg | TD | Rec | Yds | Avg | TD |
|---|---|---|---|---|---|---|---|---|---|---|
| 2013 | Antioch | 5 | 33 | 165 | 5.0 | 1 | 0 | 0 | 0.0 | 0 |
| 2014 | Antioch | 11 | 271 | 2,263 | 8.4 | 23 | 5 | 49 | 9.8 | 0 |
| 2015 | Antioch | 12 | 243 | 2,744 | 11.3 | 36 | 5 | 129 | 25.8 | 3 |
| 2016 | Antioch | 13 | 291 | 2,776 | 9.5 | 34 | 15 | 260 | 17.3 | 2 |
| Totals | | 41 | 838 | 7,948 | 9.5 | 94 | 25 | 438 | 17.5 | 5 |

== Personal life ==
Harris graduated from the University of Alabama with a degree in Consumer Sciences in 2020. During his last college football season, Harris began celebrating touchdowns by striking the iconic World Cup pose of Megan Rapinoe. He mentioned finding Rapinoe's views on feminism and standing for her beliefs as "motivating" and "inspirational".

In January 2019, Harris signed with Beast Mode Marketing, the marketing agency of former NFL running back Marshawn Lynch.

On the day of the 2021 NFL draft, Harris declined the invitation to the event in Cleveland, Ohio, opting instead to host a party for the kids served at Greater Richmond Interfaith Program, the homeless shelter where he spent his childhood. He later gathered with family and friends to watch the draft at a restaurant owned by Marshawn Lynch, in Emeryville, California.

In 2021, Harris founded the nonprofit organization Da' Bigger Picture Foundation along with assistance from California governor Gavin Newsom, which provides assistance to families impacted by homelessness and hunger.

Harris was injured during a 4th of July celebration around 12:18 AM, July 5, 2025. Multiple other people were injured. Harris suffered an unspecified, superficial eye injury.
