= Alex Leatherwood =

American football player (born 1999)

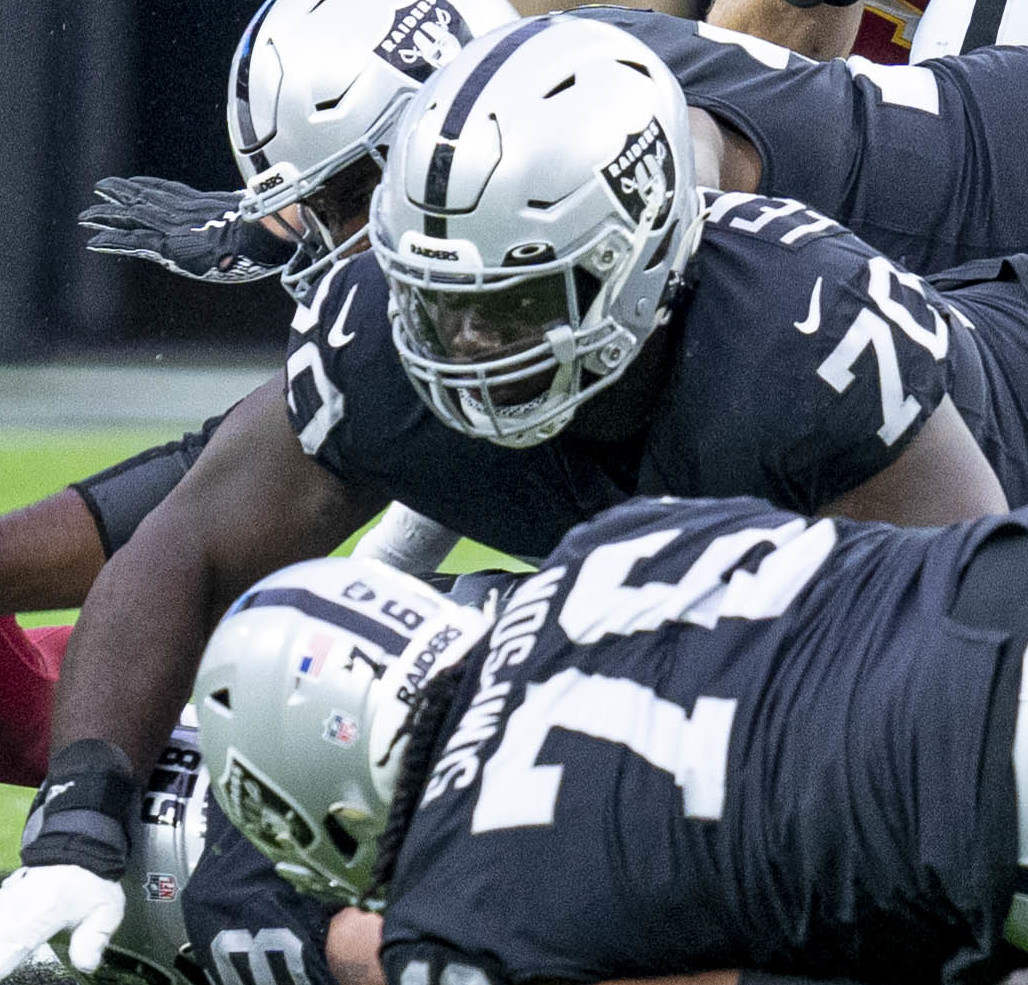
- Leatherwood with the Las Vegas Raiders in 2021

Profile
- Position: Offensive tackle

Personal information
- Born: January 5, 1999 (age 27); Pensacola, Florida, U.S.
- Listed height: 6 ft 5 in (1.96 m)
- Listed weight: 312 lb (142 kg)

Career information
- High school: Booker T. Washington (Pensacola)
- College: Alabama (2017–2020)
- NFL draft: 2021: 1st round, 17th overall pick

Career history
- Las Vegas Raiders (2021); Chicago Bears (2022); Cleveland Browns (2023)*; Los Angeles Chargers (2024)*
- * Offseason or practice squad member only

Awards and highlights
- 2× CFP national champion (2017, 2020); Outland Trophy (2020); Jacobs Blocking Trophy (2020) (Note: Co-winner with Landon Dickerson); Unanimous All-American (2020); 2× first-team All-SEC (2019, 2020); Second-team All-SEC (2018)

Career NFL statistics as of 2024
- Games played: 21
- Games started: 17
- Stats at Pro Football Reference

Alexander Leatherwood (born January 5, 1999) is an American professional football offensive tackle. He played college football for the Alabama Crimson Tide, where he was two-time CFP national champion and the winner of the Outland and Jacobs Blocking trophies in 2020. Leatherwood was selected by the Las Vegas Raiders in the first round of the 2021 NFL draft, but was released after his rookie season.

== Early life ==
Leatherwood was born on January 5, 1999, and grew up in Pensacola, Florida, where he attended Booker T. Washington High School. He was named first-team All-Area by the Pensacola News Journal as a junior and senior. As a senior, he was named a first-team All-American by Parade and named to the second-team by USA Today and played in the All-America Bowl. Leatherwood was rated a consensus five-star and top 10 recruit for his class and committed to play college football at the University of Alabama during his junior year.

== College career ==
Leatherwood enrolled at Alabama a semester early and played in seven games as a true freshman. He saw significant playing time in the 2018 CFP National Championship Game, entering the game at left tackle after starter Jonah Williams was injured in the third quarter. He was moved to right tackle during spring practice and moved again to right guard during fall training camp, winning the starting job going into his sophomore season. He started all 15 of the Crimson Tide's games, giving up 21 pressures, and was named second-team All-Southeastern Conference (SEC) by the league's coaches.

Leatherwood was moved back to the left tackle position following the season. He was named first-team preseason All-SEC and a second-team preseason All-American by Sporting News entering his junior season. He was placed on the Outland Trophy watchlist midway through the season. Leatherwood started every game for Alabama and was named first-team All-SEC by the league's coaches and second-team by the media and was named first-team All-America by the American Football Coaches Association. After considering entering the 2020 NFL Draft, Leatherwood announced that he would return to Alabama for his senior season.

As a senior, Leatherwood starting all 13 of Alabama's games as the Crimson Tide won the 2021 College Football Playoff National Championship. He was named first-team All-SEC and was the co-winner of the Jacobs Blocking Trophy along with Alabama center Landon Dickerson. Leatherwood was a unanimous first-team All-America selection and was awarded the Outland Trophy as the nation's best interior lineman.

== Professional career ==
Pre-draft measurables
Height	Weight	Arm length	Hand span	40-yard dash	10-yard split	20-yard split	20-yard shuttle	Three-cone drill	Vertical jump	Broad jump
6 ft 4 3/4 in (1.95 m)	312 lb (142 kg)	33 7/8 in (0.86 m)	9 1/2 in (0.24 m)	4.99 s	1.78 s	2.94 s	4.65 s	7.45 s	34.5 in (0.88 m)	9 ft 10 in (3.00 m)
All values from Pro Day

=== Las Vegas Raiders ===
Leatherwood was selected by the Las Vegas Raiders with the 17th overall pick in the 2021 NFL draft. On May 24, 2021, Leatherwood signed his four-year rookie contract with Las Vegas, a four-year, fully guaranteed deal worth $14.39 million. He moved to offensive guard due to struggles at tackle as a rookie and was waived on August 30, 2022.

=== Chicago Bears ===
On August 31, 2022, Leatherwood was claimed off waivers by the Chicago Bears. He was placed on the reserve/non-football illness list on September 14, 2022. He was activated on October 28.

On August 27, 2023, Leatherwood was released by the Bears.

=== Cleveland Browns ===
On August 30, 2023, Leatherwood was signed to the practice squad of the Cleveland Browns. His contract expired when the team's season ended January 13, 2024.

=== Los Angeles Chargers ===
On May 29, 2024, Leatherwood signed with the Los Angeles Chargers. He was released on August 27, and re-signed to the practice squad. Leatherwood was released by the Chargers on December 10.

== Personal life ==
In June 2020, Leatherwood wrote a screenplay for a video in support of the Black Lives Matter movement. He appeared in the video along with other Alabama players and their head coach, Nick Saban.
