= Deonte Brown =

American football player (born 1998)

Profile
- Position: Offensive guard

Personal information
- Born: January 15, 1998 (age 28); Decatur, Alabama, U.S.
- Listed height: 6 ft 3 in (1.91 m)
- Listed weight: 344 lb (156 kg)

Career information
- High school: Austin (Decatur)
- College: Alabama (2016–2020)
- NFL draft: 2021: 6th round, 193rd overall pick

Career history
- Carolina Panthers (2021–2023); Birmingham Stallions (2024–2025)

Awards and highlights
- 2× CFP national champion (2017, 2020); UFL champion (2024); First-team All-SEC (2020)

Career NFL statistics
- Games played: 3
- Stats at Pro Football Reference

Deonte Brown (born January 15, 1998) is an American professional football offensive guard. He played college football at Alabama.

== Early life ==
Brown attended Austin High School in Decatur, Alabama. He played in the 2016 Under Armour All-American Game. He committed to the University of Alabama to play college football.

== College career ==
Brown played at Alabama from 2016 to 2020. After redshirting his first year in 2016, he spent 2017 as a backup before becoming a starter midway through 2018. Overall he played in 48 games and made 26 starts.

== Professional career ==
Pre-draft measurables
Height	Weight	Arm length	Hand span	40-yard dash	10-yard split	20-yard split	20-yard shuttle	Three-cone drill	Vertical jump	Broad jump
6 ft 3 1/4 in (1.91 m)	344 lb (156 kg)	32 7/8 in (0.84 m)	9 1/4 in (0.23 m)	5.57 s	1.96 s	3.15 s	5.18 s	8.33 s	27.0 in (0.69 m)	8 ft 0 in (2.44 m)
All values from Pro Day

=== Carolina Panthers ===
Brown was drafted by the Carolina Panthers in the sixth round, 193rd overall, of the 2021 NFL draft. He signed his four-year rookie contract on May 13, 2021. He was placed on injured reserve on October 16. He was activated on November 30.

On August 30, 2022, Brown was waived by the Panthers and signed to the practice squad the next day. He signed a reserve/future contract on January 9, 2023.

On August 29, 2023, Brown was waived during final roster cuts, but signed to the practice squad the following day. He was released on November 14. On November 30, Brown was re-signed to the practice squad. He was not signed to a reserve/future contract and thus became a free agent at the end of the season upon the expiration of his practice squad contract.

=== Birmingham Stallions ===
On January 19, 2024, Brown signed with the Birmingham Stallions of the United Football League (UFL). He was placed on injured reserve on March 31, 2024. He was activated on June 4. Brown re-signed with the team on August 21, 2024. He was released on March 1, 2026.
