= Slade Bolden =

American football player (born 1999)

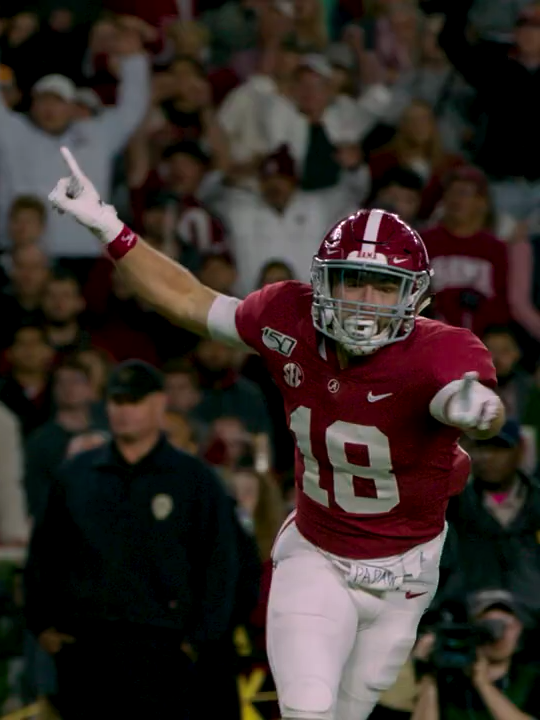
- Bolden with the Alabama Crimson Tide in 2019

Profile
- Position: Wide receiver

Personal information
- Born: January 26, 1999 (age 27); West Monroe, Louisiana, U.S.
- Listed height: 5 ft 11 in (1.80 m)
- Listed weight: 189 lb (86 kg)

Career information
- High school: West Monroe
- College: Alabama (2018–2021)
- NFL draft: 2022: undrafted

Career history
- Baltimore Ravens (2022); Atlanta Falcons (2023)*; Birmingham Stallions (2024)*
- * Offseason or practice squad member only

Awards and highlights
- CFP national champion (2020)
- Stats at Pro Football Reference

Slade Bolden (born January 26, 1999) is an American professional football wide receiver. He played college football at Alabama and was signed by the Baltimore Ravens as an undrafted free agent in 2022.

== Early life ==
Bolden grew up in West Monroe, Louisiana, and attended West Monroe High School, where he played baseball and football. He played quarterback and receiver during his junior year and rushed for 1,370 yards and 24 touchdowns with 906 passing yards and nine touchdown passes while also catching 15 passes for 248 yards and four touchdowns. As a senior, Bolden passed for 1,622 yards and 20 touchdowns and rushed for 1,460 yards and 20 touchdowns and was named the Louisiana Gatorade Player of the Year. He was rated a three-star recruit and committed to play college football at Alabama over offers from TCU and LSU.

== College career ==
Bolden played in Alabama's 2018 season opener against Louisville as a true freshman before opting to redshirt the year. As a redshirt freshman in the 2019 season, he caught two passes for 34 yards and rushed four times for 10 yards as a wildcat quarterback while also completing a six yard pass for a touchdown, which came against Tennessee. As a redshirt sophomore, Bolden became a starter at wide receiver after Jaylen Waddle suffered a broken ankle. Bolden caught a five-yard pass from Mac Jones in the 2021 College Football Playoff National Championship for his first career touchdown reception as the Crimson Tide won 52–24 over Ohio State. He finished the season with 24 receptions for 270 yards and one touchdown and returned seven punts for 29 yards. As a redshirt junior, Bolden caught 42 passes for 408 yards and three touchdowns. In the College Football Playoff Semifinal at the Cotton Bowl, he had a receiving touchdown against Cincinnati. After the season, Bolden announced that he would forgo his final year of eligibility and enter the 2022 NFL draft.

=== College statistics ===
Year	G	Receiving			
Year	G	Rec	Yds	Avg	TD
2019	7	2	34	17.0	0
2020	8	24	270	11.3	1
2021	15	42	408	9.7	3
Career	30	68	712	10.5	4

== Professional career ==
Pre-draft measurables
Height	Weight	Arm length	Hand span	Wingspan	40-yard dash	10-yard split	20-yard split	20-yard shuttle	Three-cone drill	Vertical jump	Broad jump	Bench press
5 ft 10 5/8 in (1.79 m)	193 lb (88 kg)	29 3/8 in (0.75 m)	9 3/4 in (0.25 m)	6 ft 0 1/8 in (1.83 m)	4.66 s	1.52 s	2.61 s	4.03 s	7.01 s	36.0 in (0.91 m)	9 ft 8 in (2.95 m)	11 reps
All values from NFL Combine/Pro Day

=== Baltimore Ravens ===
Bolden signed with the Baltimore Ravens as an undrafted free agent on April 30, 2022. He was waived/injured on August 23, and placed on injured reserve. He was released on October 18, 2022.

=== Atlanta Falcons ===
On May 15, 2023, Bolden signed with the Atlanta Falcons. He was waived on August 29, 2023.

=== Birmingham Stallions ===
On January 19, 2024, Bolden signed with the Birmingham Stallions of the United Football League (UFL). He was waived on March 22, 2024.
