= D. J. Dale =

American football player (born 2000)

No. 95 – Massachusetts Pirates
- Position: Defensive tackle
- Roster status: Active

Personal information
- Born: October 30, 2000 (age 26); Birmingham, Alabama, U.S.
- Listed height: 6 ft 1 in (1.85 m)
- Listed weight: 302 lb (137 kg)

Career information
- High school: Clay-Chalkville (Birmingham)
- College: Alabama (2019–2022)
- NFL draft: 2023: undrafted

Career history
- Buffalo Bills (2023)*; Massachusetts / Orlando Pirates (2025–present)
- * Offseason or practice squad member only

Awards and highlights
- CFP national champion (2020)
- Stats at Pro Football Reference

D. J. Dale (born October 30, 2000) is an American professional football defensive tackle for the Orlando Pirates of the Indoor Football League (IFL). He played college football for the Alabama Crimson Tide.

== Early life ==
Dale grew up in Birmingham, Alabama and attended Clay-Chalkville High School. Dale committed to play college football at Alabama over an offer from Auburn.

== College career ==
Dale was named Alabama's starting nose tackle going into his freshman season. He finished the season with 17 tackles, three tackles for loss, one sack and one quarterback hurry. As a sophomore, he had 22 tackles, one tackle for loss, two pass breakups, and one fumble recovery. Dale had 18 tackles with four tackles for loss and two sacks in his junior season.

== Professional career ==
Pre-draft measurables
Height	Weight	Arm length	Hand span	40-yard dash	10-yard split	20-yard split	20-yard shuttle	Three-cone drill	Vertical jump	Broad jump
6 ft 0 7/8 in (1.85 m)	302 lb (137 kg)	32 7/8 in (0.84 m)	9 3/4 in (0.25 m)	5.26 s	1.81 s	3.01 s	4.80 s	7.69 s	25.5 in (0.65 m)	8 ft 2 in (2.49 m)
All values from the NFL Combine

=== Buffalo Bills ===
Dale was signed by the Buffalo Bills as an undrafted free agent on May 12, 2023. He was waived on August 29, 2023.

=== Massachusetts Pirates ===
On January 18, 2025, Dale signed with the Massachusetts Pirates of the Indoor Football League (IFL).

On November 30, 2025, Dale re-signed with the team, now rebranded as the Orlando Pirates.
