= 2021 College Football Playoff National Championship =

College football national championship game

2021 College Football Playoff National Championship presented by AT&T
- 7th College Football Playoff National Championship
Ohio State Buckeyes	Alabama Crimson Tide
(7–0)	(12–0)
Big Ten	SEC
24	52
Head coach: Ryan Day	Head coach: Nick Saban
AP / Coaches / CFP; 3 / 3 / 3	AP / Coaches / CFP; 1 / 1 / 1
	1	2	3	4	Total
Ohio State	7	10	7	0	24
Alabama	7	28	10	7	52
- Date: January 11, 2021
- Season: 2020
- Stadium: Hard Rock Stadium
- Location: Miami Gardens, Florida
- MVP: DeVonta Smith (Alabama, WR); Christian Barmore (Alabama, DT)
- Favorite: Alabama by 9.5
- National anthem: Prerecorded due to COVID concerns
- Referee: Brandon Cruse (Big 12)
- Halftime show: Virtual performance from the Intercollegiate Marching Band
- Attendance: 14,926

United States TV coverage
- Network: ESPN
- Announcers: Chris Fowler (play-by-play); Kirk Herbstreit (analyst); Maria Taylor and Allison Williams (sideline)
- Nielsen ratings: 10.31 (18.71 million viewers)

International TV coverage
- Network: ESPN Deportes; ESPN Brasil
- Announcers: ESPN Deportes: Eduardo Varela and Pablo Viruega; ESPN Brasil: Ari Aguiar (play-by-play) and Paulo Mancha (analyst)

The 2021 College Football Playoff National Championship was a college football bowl game played on January 11, 2021, at Hard Rock Stadium in Miami Gardens, Florida. The seventh College Football Playoff National Championship, the game determined the national champion in the NCAA Division I Football Bowl Subdivision (FBS) for the 2020 season. The game started at 8:15 p.m. EST and was televised by ESPN. It was the final game of the 2020–21 College Football Playoff and, aside from the all-star games scheduled to follow, was the culminating game of the 2020–21 bowl season. Sponsored by telecommunications company AT&T, the game was officially known as the 2021 College Football Playoff National Championship presented by AT&T.

The championship featured the winner of the Rose Bowl, the top-seeded Alabama Crimson Tide from the Southeastern Conference (SEC) defeating the winners of the Sugar Bowl, the third-seeded Ohio State Buckeyes from the Big Ten Conference, 52–24. The win gave Alabama head coach Nick Saban his seventh national championship, breaking Bear Bryant's (Note: Bryant won six titles during his tenure with Alabama (1958–1982)) record for the most by a Division I college football coach.

== Background ==
This was the second of four consecutive College Football Playoff National Championship games matching the No. 3 seed and the No. 1 seed, with No. 1 LSU defeating the No. 3 Clemson Tigers 42–25 in the 2020 edition.

=== Host selection ===
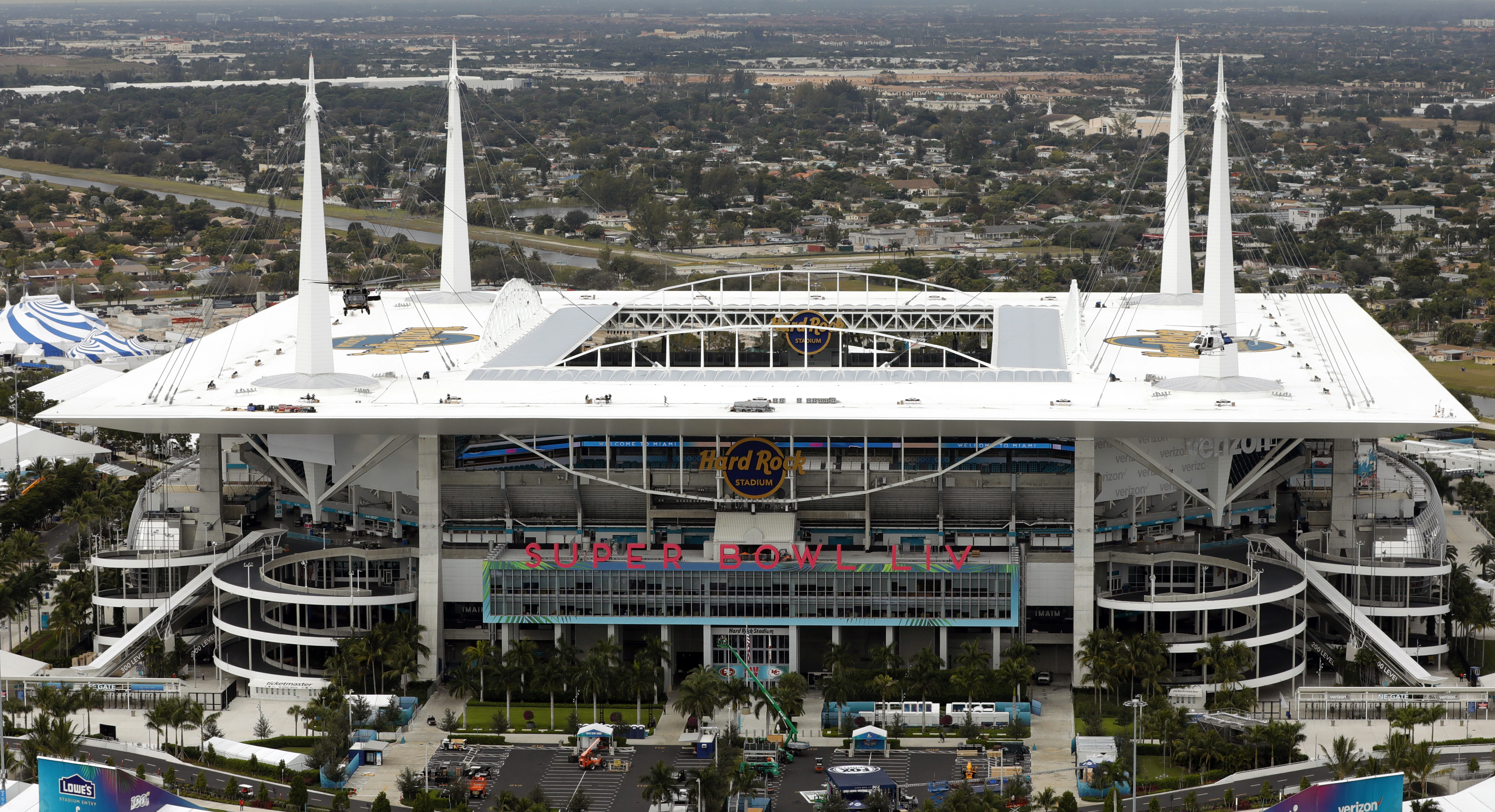
Hard Rock Stadium (seen during Super Bowl LIV the previous year), site of the National Championship game

In August 2018, Hard Rock Stadium in Miami Gardens, Florida, was announced as the host site for the seventh College Football Playoff (CFP) National Championship. The Rose Bowl and Sugar Bowl were designated as semifinal games; both semifinals were scheduled for January 1, 2021.

On August 5, 2020, CFP organizers announced that they would move the release of the final rankings and semifinal matchups (sometimes referred to as "Selection Weekend") from December 6 to 20, in order to accommodate conferences that had delayed their championship games to mid-December. On December 20, the semifinal pairings were announced, with No. 1 Alabama matched with No. 4 Notre Dame in the Rose Bowl, and No. 2 Clemson matched with No. 3 Ohio State in the Sugar Bowl.

=== Impact of the COVID-19 pandemic ===
The Rose Bowl game, normally played in Pasadena, California, was moved to Arlington, Texas, prompted by the COVID-19 pandemic in California. As the 2020 FBS season was impacted by the COVID-19 pandemic in the United States, CFP organizers had identified a contingency date of January 18 for the championship game, which did not need to be used. Attendance at Hard Rock Stadium was limited to 23% of normal capacity, with the official attendance listed as 14,926.

== Teams ==
The game featured No. 1 Alabama, winner of the Rose Bowl, and No. 3 Ohio State, winner of the Sugar Bowl. The teams had previously met four times, with Alabama holding a 3–1 edge. Their most recent meeting had been in the 2015 Sugar Bowl, a CFP semifinal, which was won by Ohio State, 42–35.

=== Alabama Crimson Tide ===
Alabama entered the National Championship game with a 12–0 record, having won all 10 of their Southeastern Conference (SEC) regular season games, followed by a win over Florida in the SEC Championship Game, and a win over Notre Dame in the Rose Bowl CFP semifinal. Alabama had a record of 2–2 in prior CFP National Championship games, having won in 2016 and 2018 and having lost in 2017 and 2019.

=== Ohio State Buckeyes ===
Ohio State entered the game with a record of 7–0, having won all five of their Big Ten Conference regular season games, followed by a win over Northwestern in the Big Ten Championship Game, and a win over Clemson in the Sugar Bowl CFP semifinal. Ohio State had appeared in one prior CFP National Championship game, having won the inaugural edition in 2015, after defeating Alabama in the semifinal. On January 11, the Buckeyes advised that 13 players would not be available for the game, including two starting defensive linemen (Tommy Togiai and Tyreke Smith) and two kickers (Blake Haubeil and Dominic DiMaccio); specific reasons were not provided, but at least one player's post on social media indicated that it was due to a positive COVID-19 test.

== Starting lineups ==
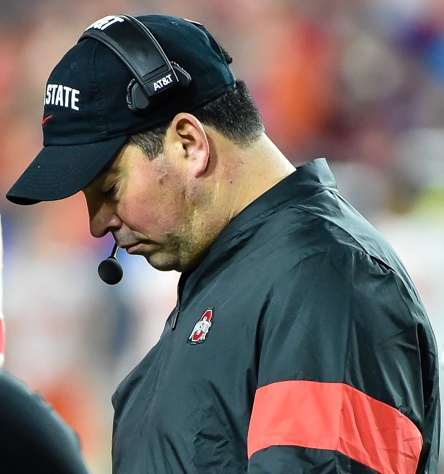
Ohio State head coach Ryan Day

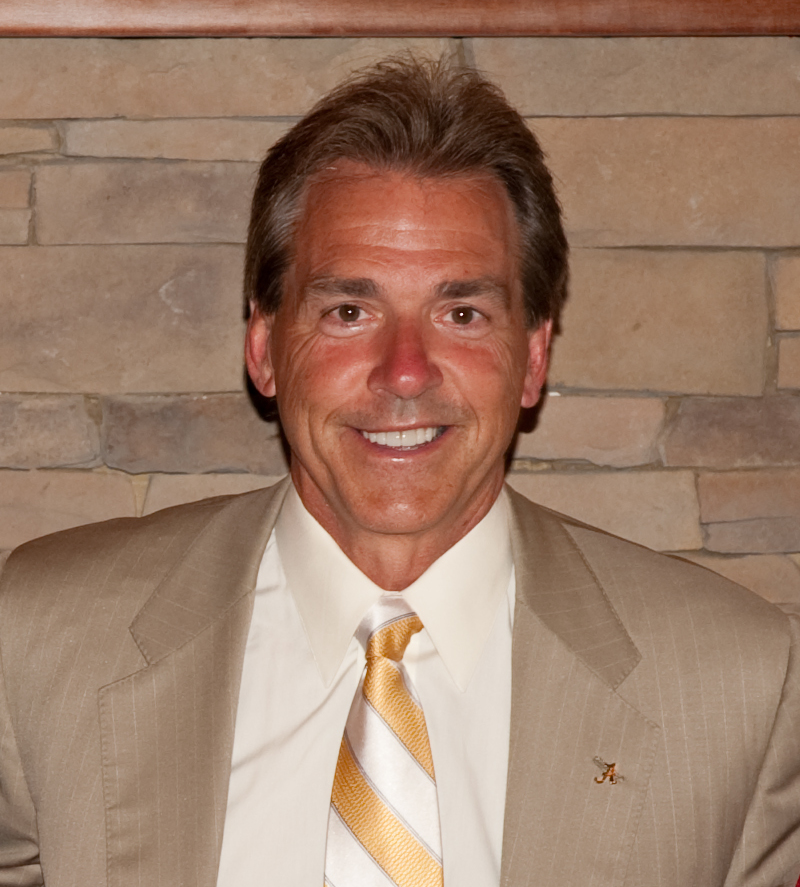
Alabama head coach Nick Saban

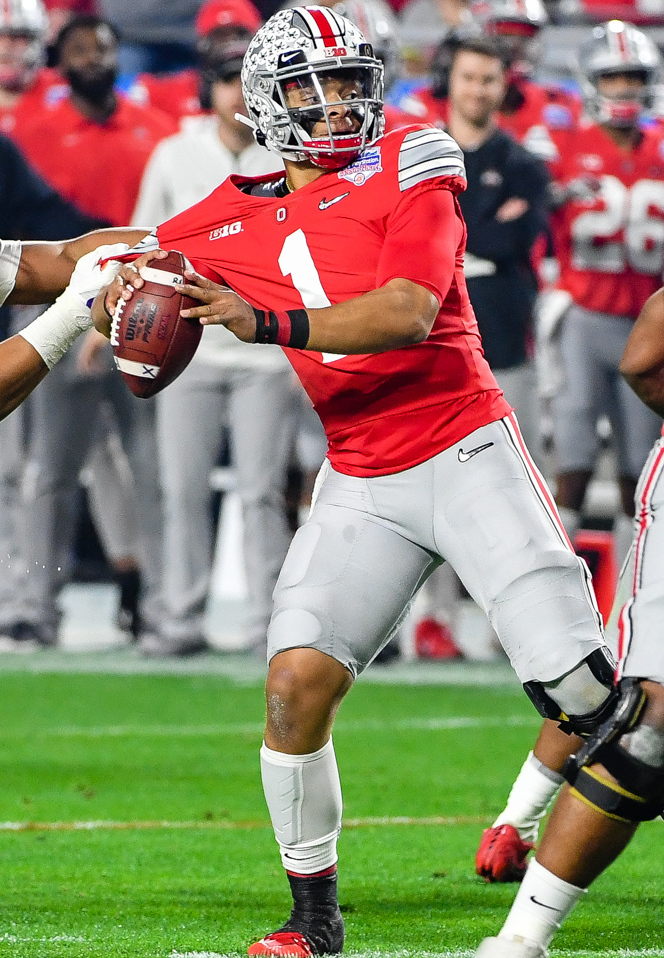
Ohio State quarterback Justin Fields

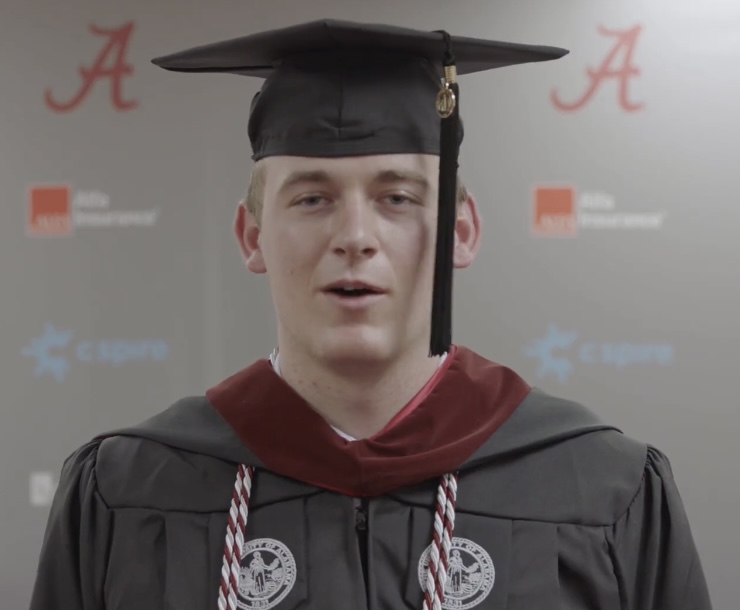
Alabama quarterback Mac Jones

Ohio State	Position		Alabama
Offense
Chris Olave 1	WR		† DeVonta Smith 1
Jameson Williams 1	WR		John Metchie III 2
Thayer Munford 7	LT		† Alex Leatherwood 1
Matthew Jones	LG		Deonte Brown 6
Josh Myers 2	C		Chris Owens
† Wyatt Davis 3	RG		Emil Ekiyor Jr.
Nicholas Petit-Frere 3	RT		Evan Neal 1
Luke Farrell 5	TE		Kendall Randolph
Garrett Wilson 1	WR	TE	Jahleel Billingsley
Justin Fields 1	QB		† Mac Jones 1
Trey Sermon 3	RB		† Najee Harris 1
Defense
Jonathon Cooper 7	DE		Christian Barmore 2
Jerron Cage	DT	NG	D. J. Dale
Haskell Garrett	DT	STAR	Brian Branch 2
Javontae Jean-Baptiste 7	DE	LB	Christian Harris 3
Tuf Borland	LB		† Dylan Moses
Justin Hilliard	LB		Will Anderson Jr. 1
Pete Werner 2	LB		Christopher Allen
Sevyn Banks	CB		† Patrick Surtain II 1
Marcus Williamson	S		Jordan Battle 3
Josh Proctor	S	FS	DeMarcco Hellams 7
† Shaun Wade 5	CB		Josh Jobe
† 2020 All-American
Selected in an NFL Draft (number corresponds to draft round)

== Game summary ==
=== First half ===
Alabama won the coin toss and deferred possession to the second half. Ohio State's opening position began on the 25 following a touchback, but quickly fizzled into a three-and-out. Alabama started their opening drive at their own 22-yard-line following the punt and picked up four first downs en route to a 4th-and-goal rushing touchdown by Najee Harris to open the scoring. During the drive, cameras showed Ohio State running back Trey Sermon walking to the locker room with an apparent shoulder injury sustained on the first play of the game. Alabama kicker Will Reichard resumed the game with another touchback, giving the Buckeyes the football on the 25-yard-line again. Ohio State's second drive looked very different from their first: Master Teague scored a touchdown on an eight-yard rush to cap an eight-play drive and tie the game. Filling in for kicker Blake Haubeil, who did not travel with the Ohio State team due to COVID issues, punter Drue Chrisman handled the kickoff, which was taken back to the 25. Alabama drove all the way to the Ohio State five-yard-line, including another 4th down conversion, before the quarter expired with the score tied at seven.

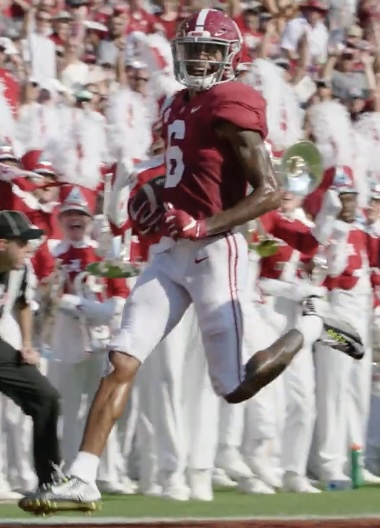
Offensive MVP DeVonta Smith

On the second quarter's opening play, Tide quarterback Mac Jones connected with Heisman winner DeVonta Smith for a five-yard passing touchdown, giving Alabama a lead it would not relinquish for the rest of the game. Following the conclusion of the drive, it was announced that Trey Sermon was on the way to the hospital and would not return for the game. Ohio State's ensuing drive began on the 25 after a touchback. The Buckeyes drove the ball to the Alabama 44 before stalling; the ensuing punt was downed by the Tide at their own 12-yard-line. Alabama started their next drive with a 12-yard pass from Jones to Smith, before Ohio State linebacker Baron Browning sacked Jones and forced a fumble, which he recovered. Ohio State took one play to find the end zone – following a pass interference in the end zone, the Buckeyes got the ball on the 4-yard-line and tied the game with a Master Teague rushing touchdown, his second of the contest. The Tide responded quickly; it took them only five plays to score on a Najee Harris 26-yard reception, giving them back a touchdown lead. On the ensuing Ohio State drive, Alabama safety Jordan Battle was disqualified for targeting; the Buckeyes finished the drive with a field goal, cutting the Alabama lead to four. Alabama's next drive began on their own 25, and the Tide's offense had no problem moving the ball down the field again, with Jones finding Smith for the second time to take a two-possession lead. The Buckeyes' offense gained only four yards on their ensuing drive, and they punted for the second time. Smith returned the punt for 19 yards, setting Alabama up at their own 40-yard-line. Alabama scored even quicker on this drive – Smith found the end zone on a 42-yard pass on just the third play of the drive to extend the lead to 18 points. Ohio State ended their final drive of the half with another three-and-out, and their defense held with seconds left on the clock in the half and forced an Alabama punt, their first of the game. Ohio State knelt the ball and ended the first half, with Alabama leading 35–17 at halftime.

=== Second half ===
Alabama started their first drive of the second half with the ball on their own 23-yard-line, and ended the drive with a Will Reichard field goal sixteen plays later, making this drive the game's longest. Ohio State responded with their shortest touchdown drive of the contest, as a 33-yard rush by Justin Fields set up a 20-yard pass from Fields to wide receiver Garrett Wilson, cutting Alabama's lead back to two touchdowns. During Alabama's ensuing drive, DeVonta Smith suffered a hand injury that caused him to retreat to the locker room. The Crimson Tide scored again, as Slade Bolden caught a five-yard Mac Jones pass and increased the lead back to 21. Ohio State's first turnover of the game, a turnover on downs, ended their next drive at their own 43-yard-line, and the third quarter ended shortly thereafter.

Alabama increased their lead to four touchdowns on the fourth play of the game's final quarter, as Najee Harris scored for the second time. Ohio State's next drive saw them take the ball all the way to the Alabama 6-yard-line, but an incomplete pass on 4th & goal ended the Buckeyes' drive with a turnover on downs. Neither offense could capitalize on their next possession, as the teams then traded three-and-outs. Alabama was able to run the remaining clock out and the game and football season concluded with the Crimson Tide as national champions, 52–24. Despite being injured in the third quarter, DeVonta Smith was named the offensive most valuable player (MVP), and Christian Barmore of Alabama's defensive line was named defensive MVP.

=== Scoring summary ===
2021 College Football Playoff National Championship

Quarter	1	2	3	4	Total
No. 3 Ohio State	7	10	7	0	24
No. 1 Alabama	7	28	10	7	52

at Hard Rock Stadium • Miami Gardens, Florida

- Date: January 11, 2021
- Game time: 8:00 p.m. EST
- Game weather: Fair • Temperature: 69 °F (21 °C) • Wind: NNE 3 mph
- Game attendance: 14,926
- Referee: Brandon Cruse (Big 12)
- TV announcers (ESPN): Chris Fowler (play-by-play), Kirk Herbstreit (color), Maria Taylor and Allison Williams (sideline)
- ESPN game summary

Game information

First quarter

- (8:07) BAMA – Najee Harris 1 yard rush, Will Reichard kick (Drive: 12 plays, 78 yards, 5:32; Alabama 7–0)
- (4:55) OSU – Master Teague 8 yard rush, Jake Seibert kick (Drive: 8 plays, 75 yards, 3:12; Tied 7–7)

Second quarter

- (14:53) BAMA – DeVonta Smith 5 yard pass from Mac Jones, Will Reichard kick (Drive: 11 plays, 75 yards, 4:58; Alabama 14–7)
- (11:43) OSU – Master Teague 4 yard rush, Jake Seibert kick (Drive: 1 play, 19 yards, 0:11; Tied 14–14)
- (9:00) BAMA – Najee Harris 26 yard pass from Mac Jones, Will Reichard kick (Drive: 5 plays, 75 yards, 2:43; Alabama 21–14)
- (5:21) OSU – Jake Seibert 23 yard field goal (Drive: 9 plays, 69 yards, 3:39; Alabama 21–17)
- (3:19) BAMA – DeVonta Smith 5 yard pass from Mac Jones, Will Reichard kick (Drive: 5 plays, 75 yards, 2:02; Alabama 28–17)
- (1:48) BAMA – DeVonta Smith 42 yard pass from Mac Jones, Will Reichard kick (Drive: 3 plays, 60 yards, 1:41; Alabama 35–17)

Third quarter

- (7:47) BAMA – Will Reichard 20 yard field goal (Drive: 16 plays, 75 yards, 7:08; Alabama 38–17)
- (6:45) OSU – Garrett Wilson 20 yard pass from Justin Fields, Jake Seibert kick (Drive: 3 plays, 75 yards, 1:02; Alabama 38–24)
- (2:52) BAMA – Slade Bolden 5 yard pass from Mac Jones, Will Reichard kick (Drive: 8 plays, 75 yards, 3:53; Alabama 45–24)

Fourth quarter

- (13:15) BAMA – Najee Harris 1 yard rush, Will Reichard kick (Drive: 6 plays, 43 yards, 2:47; Alabama 52–24)

=== Statistics ===
Statistics	Ohio State	Alabama
First downs	19	33
Plays–yards	62–341	83–621
Rushes–yards	29–147	38–157
Passing yards	194	464
Passing: comp–att–int	17–33–0	36–45–0
Turnovers		
Time of possession	22:34	37:26

Team	Category	Player	Statistics
Ohio State	Passing	Justin Fields	17/33, 194 yards, 1 TD
Ohio State	Rushing	Justin Fields	6 carries, 67 yards
Ohio State	Receiving	Chris Olave	8 receptions, 69 yards
Alabama	Passing	Mac Jones	36/45, 464 yards, 5 TD
Alabama	Rushing	Najee Harris	22 carries, 79 yards, 2 TD
Alabama	Receiving	DeVonta Smith	12 receptions, 215 yards, 3 TD

== Broadcasting ==
The game was televised nationally in the United States by ESPN for the seventh straight year, along with its sister networks and ESPN+ in a "Megacast" made up of several other channels, including game data, radio calls from the Ohio State and Alabama radio networks, stadium audio-only, and other camera angles. The game announcers were Chris Fowler and Kirk Herbstreit, with Maria Taylor and Allison Williams serving as sideline reporters.

== See also ==
- 2021 Orange Bowl (January), played at the same venue nine days earlier
