= Jacobs Blocking Trophy =

Several annual college football awards

The Jacobs Blocking Trophy is the name of several similar annual college football awards bestowed by a conference upon their best blocker. The awards are named in honor of William P. Jacobs, son of the founder and president of Presbyterian College from 1935 to 1945. The trophies are awarded by his son, Hugh, and great-grandson, William P. Jacobs V (ACC Trophy), based upon voting of the respective leagues' coaches. The award was originally presented to a player from the state of South Carolina from 1928 to 1932. A duplicate award was created and given to a player in the Southern Conference (SoCon) beginning in 1933. The Southeastern Conference (SEC) began the award in 1935. The Atlantic Coast Conference (ACC) established its own version of the Jacobs Blocking Trophy in its first year of existence in 1953. The Division II South Atlantic Conference also bestows a version of the award.

== See also ==
- Southeastern Conference football individual awards
