= 2022 Alabama Crimson Tide football team =

American college football season

2022 Alabama Crimson Tide football

SEC Western Division co-champion Sugar Bowl champion

Sugar Bowl, W 45–20 vs. Kansas State
- Conference: Southeastern Conference
- Western Division

Ranking
- Coaches: No. 5
- AP: No. 5
- Record: 11–2 (6–2 SEC)
- Head coach: Nick Saban (16th season)
- Offensive coordinator: Bill O'Brien (2nd season)
- Offensive scheme: Pro spread
- Defensive coordinator: Pete Golding (5th season)
- Co-defensive coordinator: Charles Kelly (4th season)
- Base defense: 3–4
- Home stadium: Bryant–Denny Stadium

2022 Southeastern Conference football standings
| | Conf. | | | Overall |
| Team | W | | L | W | | L |
|---|---|---|---|---|---|---|
Eastern Division
| No. 1 Georgia xy$#^ | 8 | – | 0 | 15 | – | 0 |
| No. 6 Tennessee | 6 | – | 2 | 11 | – | 2 |
| No. 23 South Carolina | 4 | – | 4 | 8 | – | 5 |
| Kentucky | 3 | – | 5 | 7 | – | 6 |
| Florida | 3 | – | 5 | 6 | – | 7 |
| Missouri | 3 | – | 5 | 6 | – | 7 |
| Vanderbilt | 2 | – | 6 | 5 | – | 7 |
Western Division
| No. 16 LSU xy | 6 | – | 2 | 10 | – | 4 |
| No. 5 Alabama x | 6 | – | 2 | 11 | – | 2 |
| No. 20 Mississippi State | 4 | – | 4 | 9 | – | 4 |
| Ole Miss | 4 | – | 4 | 8 | – | 5 |
| Arkansas | 3 | – | 5 | 7 | – | 6 |
| Auburn | 2 | – | 6 | 5 | – | 7 |
| Texas A&M | 2 | – | 6 | 5 | – | 7 |
Championship: Georgia 50, LSU 30
# – College Football Playoff champion; ^ – College Football Playoff participant; $ – Conference champion; x – Division champion/co-champions; y – Championship game participant; Rankings from AP Poll

The 2022 Alabama Crimson Tide football team (variously "Alabama", "Bama", or "The Tide") represented the University of Alabama in the 2022 NCAA Division I FBS football season. This was the Crimson Tide's 128th overall season, 89th as a member of the Southeastern Conference (SEC), and 31st within the SEC Western Division. They played their home games at Bryant–Denny Stadium in Tuscaloosa, Alabama. They were led by their head coach Nick Saban in his 16th season.

== Offseason ==
Positions key
| Offense | Defense | Special teams |
|---|---|---|
| QB — Quarterback; RB — Running back; FB — Fullback; WR — Wide receiver; TE — Tight end; OL — Offensive lineman; T — Tackle; G — Guard; C — Center | DL — Defensive lineman; DT — Defensive tackle (Note: Includes nose tackle (NT)); DE — Defensive end; EDGE — Edge rusher; LB — Linebacker (Note: Includes middle linebacker (MLB/MIKE), weakside linebacker (WILL), strongside linebacker (SAM), off-ball linebacker, and outside linebacker (OLB)); DB — Defensive back; CB — Cornerback; S — Safety (Note: Includes free safety (FS) and strong safety (SS)) | K — Kicker (Note: Also known as a placekicker (PK)); P — Punter; LS — Long snapper; RS — Return specialist (Note: Includes kickoff and punt returners) |

=== Departures ===
==== Team departures ====
Over the course of the off-season, Alabama lost 37 total players. 8 players graduated, 6 declared for the 2022 NFL Draft, while the other 23 entered the transfer portal.

2022 Alabama offseason departures
| Name | Number | Pos. | Height | Weight | Year | Hometown | Notes |
|---|---|---|---|---|---|---|---|
| Christian Harris | #8 | LB | 6′ 2″ | 232 | Junior | Baton Rouge, LA | Declared for 2022 NFL Draft |
| Slade Bolden | #18 | WR | 5′ 11″ | 191 | (redshirt) Junior | West Monroe, LA | Declared for 2022 NFL Draft |
| Jalyn Armour-Davis | #5 | DB | 6′ 1″ | 182 | (redshirt) Junior | Mobile, AL | Declared for 2022 NFL Draft |
| Evan Neal | #73 | OL | 6′ 7″ | 350 | Junior | Okeechobee, FL | Declared for 2022 NFL Draft |
| Jameson Williams | #1 | WR | 6′ 2″ | 189 | Junior | St. Louis, MO | Declared for 2022 NFL Draft |
| John Metchie III | #8 | WR | 6′ 0″ | 195 | Junior | Brampton, Canada | Declared for 2022 NFL Draft |
| Christopher Allen | #4 | LB | 6′ 4″ | 242 | (redshirt) Senior | Baton Rouge, LA | Graduated/Declared for 2022 NFL Draft |
| Josh Jobe | #28 | CB | 6′ 1″ | 194 | Senior | Miami, FL | Graduated/Declared for 2022 NFL Draft |
| Phidarian Mathis | #48 | DL | 6′ 4″ | 312 | (redshirt) Senior | Wisner, LA | Graduated/Declared for 2022 NFL Draft |
| Chris Owens | #79 | OL | 6′ 3" | 305 | Grad Student | Arlington, TX | Graduated |
| LaBryan Ray | #18 | DL | 6′ 5″ | 285 | (redshirt) Senior | Madison, AL | Graduated |
| Brian Robinson Jr. | #4 | RB | 6′ 1″ | 225 | Grad Student | Tuscaloosa, AL | Graduated/Declared for 2022 NFL Draft |
| Major Tennison | #88 | TE | 6′ 5″ | 252 | (redshirt) Senior | Flint, TX | Graduated |
| Daniel Wright | #3 | DB | 6′ 1″ | 195 | (redshirt) Senior | Fort Lauderdale, FL | Graduated |

==== Outgoing transfers ====
Twenty-three players elected to enter the NCAA Transfer Portal during or after the 2021 season.

| Name | No. | Pos. | Height | Weight | Hometown | Year | New school |
|---|---|---|---|---|---|---|---|
| Xavier Williams | #3 | WR | 6′ 1″ | 190 | Hollywood, FL | (redshirt) Junior | Transferred to Utah State |
| Javon Baker | #5 | WR | 6′ 1″ | 183 | Atlanta, GA | Sophomore | Transferred to UCF |
| Paul Tyson | #17 | QB | 6′ 5″ | 228 | Trussville, AL | (redshirt) Sophomore | Transferred to Arizona State |
| Stone Hollenbach | #19 | QB | 6′ 3″ | 208 | Catawissa, PA | (redshirt) Sophomore | Transferred to Western Michigan |
| Jahleel Billingsley | #19 | TE | 6′ 4″ | 230 | Chicago, IL | Junior | Transferred to Texas |
| Kaine Williams | #20 | DB | 6′ 2″ | 203 | Marrero, LA | (redshirt) Freshman | Transferred to Nebraska |
| Drew Sanders | #20 | LB | 6′ 5″ | 244 | Denton, TX | Sophomore | Transferred to Arkansas |
| Brylan Lanier | #21 | DB | 6′ 1″ | 170 | Tuscaloosa, AL | Freshman | Transferred to Indiana |
| Camar Wheaton | #25 | RB | 5′ 11″ | 190 | Garland, TX | Freshman | Transferred to SMU |
| Marcus Banks | #26 | DB | 6′ 0″ | 180 | Houston, TX | Junior | Transferred to Mississippi State |
| Kyle Edwards | #27 | RB | 6′ 2″ | 209 | Destrehan, LA | Freshman | Transferred to SE Louisiana |
| King Mwikuta | #30 | LB | 6′ 5″ | 238 | West Point, GA | Junior | Transferred to Arkansas State |
| DJ Rias | #30 | WR | 5′ 9″ | 186 | Phenix City, AL | Freshman | Transferred to Samford |
| Jackson Bratton | #33 | LB | 6′ 3″ | 225 | Muscle Shoals, AL | Sophomore | Transferred to UAB |
| Shane Lee | #35 | LB | 6′ 0″ | 246 | Burtonsville, MD | Junior | Transferred to USC |
| Donovan Hardin | #67 | OL | 6′ 3″ | 285 | Dublin, OH | Sophomore | Transferred to LIU |
| Pierce Quick | #72 | OL | 6′ 5″ | 280 | Trussville, AL | (redshirt) Sophomore | Transferred to Georgia Tech |
| Tommy Brown | #75 | OL | 6′ 7″ | 320 | Santa Ana, CA | (redshirt) Junior | Transferred to Colorado |
| Dayne Shor | #75 | OL | 6′ 6″ | 295 | Alpharetta, GA | Freshman | Transferred to UConn |
| Agiye Hall | #84 | WR | 6′ 3″ | 195 | Valrico, FL | Freshman | Transferred to Texas |
| Caden Clark | #87 | TE | 6′ 4″ | 258 | Akron, OH | Freshman | Transferred to Akron |
| Kyle Mann | #89 | DL | 6′ 0″ | 270 | Powder Springs, GA | Sophomore | Transferred to Alabama A&M |
| Stephon Wynn Jr. | #90 | DL | 6′ 4″ | 311 | Anderson, SC | (redshirt) Junior | Transferred to Nebraska |
| Keelan Cox | #97 | DL | 6′ 5″ | 240 | Missouri City, TX | Sophomore | Transferred to Wyoming |

Note: Players with a dash in the new school column didn't land on a new team for the 2022 season.

=== Acquisitions ===
==== Incoming transfers ====
Over the off-season, Alabama added 6 players from the transfer portal. According to 247 Sports, Alabama had the 6th ranked transfer class in the country. The first transfer was running back Jahmyr Gibbs. Gibbs transferred from Georgia Tech. On the offensive side, Alabama also added Georgia wide receiver Jermaine Burton, Louisville wide receiver Tyler Harrell and Vanderbilt offensive lineman Tyler Steen. However, Alabama only took 1 defensive transfer in LSU defensive back Elias Ricks.

| Name | No. | Pos. | Height | Weight | Year | Hometown | Pre. school |
|---|---|---|---|---|---|---|---|
| Jahmyr Gibbs | #1 | RB | 5′ 11″ | 200 | Sophomore | Dalton, GA | Georgia Tech |
| Jermaine Burton | #3 | WR | 6′ 0″ | 200 | Sophomore | Calabasas, CA | Georgia |
| Elias Ricks | #7 | CB | 6′ 2″ | 196 | Sophomore | Rancho Cucamonga, CA | LSU |
| Tyler Harrell | #8 | WR | 6′ 0″ | 197 | (redshirt) Junior | Miami, FL | Louisville |
| Joseph Narcisse II | #33 | DB | 6′ 1″ | 190 | Junior | Miami, FL | Alabama A&M |
| Tyler Steen | #54 | OL | 6′ 5″ | 315 | Senior | Miami, FL | Vanderbilt |

==== 2022 recruiting class ====
Alabama signed 26 players in the class of 2022. The Crimson Tide' recruiting class ranks 2nd in the 247Sports and Rivals rankings. Nineteen signees were ranked in the ESPN 300 top prospect list. Alabama also signed walk-ons during national signing period.

College recruiting
| Name | Hometown | School | Height | Weight | Commit date |
|---|---|---|---|---|---|
| Tyler Booker; OT | Bradenton, Florida | IMG Academy | 6 ft 5 in (1.96 m) | 325 lb (147 kg) | Jul 16, 2021 |
| Tyler Booker; OT | Recruit ratings: Rivals: 247Sports: On3: ESPN: (91) | | | | |
| Jeremiah Alexander; DE | Alabaster, Alabama | Thompson High School | 6 ft 2 in (1.88 m) | 230 lb (100 kg) | Jul 8, 2021 |
| Jeremiah Alexander; DE | Recruit ratings: Rivals: 247Sports: On3: ESPN: (90) | | | | |
| Shazz Preston; WR | St. James, Louisiana | Saint James High School | 5 ft 11 in (1.80 m) | 180 lb (82 kg) | Dec 15, 2021 |
| Shazz Preston; WR | Recruit ratings: Rivals: 247Sports: On3: ESPN: (90) | | | | |
| Emmanuel Henderson; RB | Hartford, Alabama | Geneva County High School | 6 ft 1 in (1.85 m) | 185 lb (84 kg) | Mar 13, 2021 |
| Emmanuel Henderson; RB | Recruit ratings: Rivals: 247Sports: On3: ESPN: (89) | | | | |
| Ty Simpson; QB | Martin, Tennessee | Westview High School | 6 ft 2 in (1.88 m) | 200 lb (91 kg) | Feb 26, 2021 |
| Ty Simpson; QB | Recruit ratings: Rivals: 247Sports: On3: ESPN: (87) | | | | |
| Jaheim Oatis; DT | Columbia, Mississippi | Columbia High School | 6 ft 4 in (1.93 m) | 350 lb (160 kg) | Apr 14, 2021 |
| Jaheim Oatis; DT | Recruit ratings: Rivals: 247Sports: On3: ESPN: (87) | | | | |
| Shawn Murphy; LB | Manassas, Virginia | Unity Reed High School | 6 ft 2 in (1.88 m) | 215 lb (98 kg) | Jul 25, 2021 |
| Shawn Murphy; LB | Recruit ratings: Rivals: 247Sports: On3: ESPN: (87) | | | | |
| Khurtiss Perry; DT | Pike Road, Alabama | Pike Road High School | 6 ft 3 in (1.91 m) | 265 lb (120 kg) | Dec 15, 2021 |
| Khurtiss Perry; DT | Recruit ratings: Rivals: 247Sports: On3: ESPN: (86) | | | | |
| Trequon Fegans; CB | Alabaster, Alabama | Thompson High School | 6 ft 1 in (1.85 m) | 185 lb (84 kg) | Oct 18, 2021 |
| Trequon Fegans; CB | Recruit ratings: Rivals: 247Sports: On3: ESPN: (85) | | | | |
| Antonio Kite; ATH | Anniston, Alabama | Anniston High School | 6 ft 2 in (1.88 m) | 180 lb (82 kg) | Jul 4, 2021 |
| Antonio Kite; ATH | Recruit ratings: Rivals: 247Sports: On3: ESPN: (85) | | | | |
| Isaiah Bond; WR | Buford, Georgia | Buford High School | 6 ft 0 in (1.83 m) | 190 lb (86 kg) | Dec 7, 2021 |
| Isaiah Bond; WR | Recruit ratings: Rivals: 247Sports: On3: ESPN: (84) | | | | |
| Aaron Anderson; WR | New Orleans, Louisiana | Edna Karr High School | 5 ft 10 in (1.78 m) | 180 lb (82 kg) | Oct 29, 2021 |
| Aaron Anderson; WR | Recruit ratings: Rivals: 247Sports: On3: ESPN: (84) | | | | |
| Elijah Pritchett; OT | Columbus, Georgia | Carver High School | 6 ft 6 in (1.98 m) | 280 lb (130 kg) | Sep 28, 2021 |
| Elijah Pritchett; OT | Recruit ratings: Rivals: 247Sports: On3: ESPN: (84) | | | | |
| Kendrick Law; ATH | Shreveport, Louisiana | Captain Shreve High School | 5 ft 11 in (1.80 m) | 185 lb (84 kg) | Dec 17, 2021 |
| Kendrick Law; ATH | Recruit ratings: Rivals: 247Sports: On3: ESPN: (83) | | | | |
| Jihaad Campbell; LB | Erial, New Jersey | IMG Academy (FL) | 6 ft 3 in (1.91 m) | 215 lb (98 kg) | Dec 15, 2021 |
| Jihaad Campbell; LB | Recruit ratings: Rivals: 247Sports: On3: ESPN: (83) | | | | |
| Jamarion Miller; RB | Tyler, Texas | Tyler Legacy High School | 5 ft 9 in (1.75 m) | 185 lb (84 kg) | Dec 15, 2021 |
| Jamarion Miller; RB | Recruit ratings: Rivals: 247Sports: On3: ESPN: (83) | | | | |
| Earl Little Jr. CB | Plantation, Florida | American Heritage High School | 6 ft 0 in (1.83 m) | 165 lb (75 kg) | Dec 15, 2021 |
| Earl Little Jr. CB | Recruit ratings: Rivals: 247Sports: On3: ESPN: (82) | | | | |
| Isaiah Hastings; DT | Toronto, Canada | Clearwater Academy (FL) | 6 ft 5 in (1.96 m) | 260 lb (120 kg) | Nov 9, 2021 |
| Isaiah Hastings; DT | Recruit ratings: Rivals: 247Sports: On3: ESPN: (80) | | | | |
| Amari Niblack; TE | Saint Petersburg, Florida | Lakewood High School | 6 ft 3 in (1.91 m) | 215 lb (98 kg) | Jun 24, 2021 |
| Amari Niblack; TE | Recruit ratings: Rivals: 247Sports: On3: ESPN: (80) | | | | |
| Jake Pope; S | Buford, Georgia | Buford High School | 6 ft 0 in (1.83 m) | 190 lb (86 kg) | Aug 16, 2021 |
| Jake Pope; S | Recruit ratings: Rivals: 247Sports: On3: ESPN: (80) | | | | |
| Kobe Prentice; WR | Calera, Alabama | Calera High School | 5 ft 10 in (1.78 m) | 175 lb (79 kg) | Jul 27, 2021 |
| Kobe Prentice; WR | Recruit ratings: Rivals: 247Sports: On3: ESPN: (80) | | | | |
| Elijah Brown; TE | Dayton, Ohio | Wayne High School | 6 ft 5 in (1.96 m) | 225 lb (102 kg) | Feb 12, 2021 |
| Elijah Brown; TE | Recruit ratings: Rivals: 247Sports: On3: ESPN: (80) | | | | |
| Danny Lewis; TE | New Iberia, Louisiana | Westgate High School | 6 ft 4 in (1.93 m) | 230 lb (100 kg) | Feb 2, 2022 |
| Danny Lewis; TE | Recruit ratings: Rivals: 247Sports: On3: ESPN: (79) | | | | |
Overall recruit ranking: Rivals: 1 247Sports: 2 On3: 2 ESPN: 3
Note: In many cases, Scout, Rivals, 247Sports, On3, and ESPN may conflict in their listings of height and weight.; In these cases, the average was taken. ESPN grades are on a 100-point scale.; Sources: "Rivals commits". Rivals.; "ESPN commits". ESPN.; "2022 Team Ranking". Rivals.com.; "247Sports commits". 247Sports.

*= 247Sports Composite rating; ratings are out of 1.00. (five stars= 1.00–.98, four stars= .97–.90, three stars= .80–.89, two stars= .79–.70, no stars= <70)
†= Despite being rated as a four and five star recruit by ESPN, On3.com, Rivals.com and 247Sports.com, Alexander received a five star 247Sports Composite rating.
Δ= Left the Alabama program following signing but prior to the 2022 season.

2022 overall class rankings

| Website | National rank | Conference rank | 5 star recruits | 4 star recruits | 3 star recruits | 2 star recruits | 1 star recruits | No star ranking |
|---|---|---|---|---|---|---|---|---|
| ESPN | #3 | #3 | 3 | 21 | 1 | 0 | 0 | 0 |
| On3 Recruits | #2 | #2 | 4 | 19 | 2 | 0 | 0 | 0 |
| Rivals | #1 | #1 | 4 | 17 | 3 | 0 | 0 | 0 |
| 247 Sports | #2 | #2 | 4 | 18 | 3 | 0 | 0 | 0 |

==== Walk-ons ====
| Name | Pos. | Height | Weight | Hometown | High school |
|---|---|---|---|---|---|
| Peyton Fox | TE | 6′ 2″ | 225 | Birmingham, AL | Briarwood Christian School |
| Jack Standeffer | DB | 5′ 10″ | 160 | Tuscaloosa, AL | Tuscaloosa Academy |
| Cade Ott Carruth | QB | 6′ 1″ | 195 | Trussville, AL | Hewitt-Trussville High School |
| JD Baird | LB | 5′ 8″ | 180 | Tuscaloosa, AL | American Christian Academy |
| Amanni Stewart | QB | 6′ 2″ | 205 | Bowie, MD | Charles Herbert Flowers High School |
| Zeb Vickery | QB | 6′ 2″ | 195 | Flomaton, AL | Flomaton High School |
| Rodney Johnson | DB | 5′ 11″ | 160 | Gadsden, AL | Gadsden City High School |
| Michael Lorino III | RB | 5′ 9″ | 185 | Birmingham, AL | Mountain Brook High School |
| Logan Mooney | DB | 5′ 11″ | 175 | Stevensville, MI | Lake Shore High School |
| Jay Loper Jr. | WR | 5′ 11″ | 180 | Daphne, AL | Bayside Academy |
| Mekeil Stewart | WR | 5′ 10″ | 180 | Miami, FL | Deerfield Beach High School |
| Marcus Early Jr. | DB | 5′ 11″ | 180 | Warner Robins, GA | Peach County High School |
| Deshawn Samples | WR | 5′ 9″ | 160 | Richland, WA | Hanford High School |
| Josh Austin | DB | 6′ 2″ | 190 | Pinson, AL | Clay-Chalkville High School |
| Ty Roper | DB | 5′ 8″ | 189 | Foley, AL | Foley High School |
| Chase Davis | DB | 6′ 1″ | 182 | Tuscaloosa, AL | Paul W. Bryant High School |
| Prince Butler | DB | 6′ 1″ | 200 | Alexandria, VA | Hayfield High School |
| Jax Porter | TE | 6′ 6″ | 232 | Dallas, TX | IMG Academy |
| Alex Rozier | SN | 6′ 4″ | 220 | Hattiesburg, MS | Oak Grove High School |
| Vito Perri | LB | 5′ 11″ | 178 | Alpharetta, GA | Alpharetta High School |
| Wilder Hines | OL | 6′ 2″ | 240 | Birmingham, AL | Mountain Brook High School |
| Braxton Wetzler | OL | 6′ 0″ | 260 | Mountain Brook, AL | Mountain Brook High School |
| Tristan Walker | DL | 6′ 1″ | 280 | Madison, AL | James Clemens High School |
| Nick Serpa | P | 6′ 4″ | 215 | Foothill Ranch, CA | Trabuco Hills High School |
| Caleb McDougle | DB | 5′ 11″ | 205 | Muscle Shoals, AL | Muscle Shoals High School |
| Steven Harvey Jr. | WR | 5′ 9″ | 155 | Opelika, AL | Tuscaloosa Academy |
| Miles Kitselman | TE | 6′ 5″ | 250 | Lyndon, KS | Lyndon High School/Hutchinson CC |

=== NFL draft ===
Several Crimson Tide players have declared for the 2022 NFL draft thus far. Wide receivers Slade Bolden, John Metchie III and Jameson Williams, running back Brian Robinson, offensive lineman Evan Neal, defensive lineman Phidarian Mathis, defensive backs Josh Jobe and Jalyn Armour-Davis and linebackers Chris Allen and Christian Harris. They all entered their names into the draft pool. Due to COVID-19, the NCAA granted an extra year of eligibility to all college athletes, and all could have returned for another year at Alabama.

| Player | Position | Team | Round | Pick |
|---|---|---|---|---|
| Evan Neal | OT | New York Giants | 1 | 7 |
| Jameson Williams | WR | Detroit Lions | 1 | 12 |
| John Metchie III | WR | Houston Texans | 2 | 44 |
| Phidarian Mathis | DT | Washington Commanders | 2 | 47 |
| Christian Harris | LB | Houston Texans | 3 | 75 |
| Brian Robinson Jr. | RB | Washington Commanders | 3 | 98 |
| Jalyn Armour-Davis | CB | Baltimore Ravens | 4 | 119 |

=== Returning starters ===
Offense

| Player | Class | Position |
|---|---|---|
| Bryce Young | Junior | Quarterback |
| Javion Cohen | Junior | Offensive Line |
| Emil Ekiyor Jr. | RS Senior | Offensive Line |
| Seth McLaughlin | Junior | Offensive Line |
| Cameron Latu | RS Senior | Tight End |

Defense

| Player | Class | Position |
|---|---|---|
| D. J. Dale | Senior | Defensive Line |
| Byron Young | Senior | Defensive Line |
| Will Anderson Jr. | Junior | Linebacker |
| Henry To'oTo'o | Senior | Linebacker |
| Dallas Turner | Sophomore | Linebacker |
| Kool-Aid McKinstry | Sophomore | Cornerback |
| Jordan Battle | Senior | Defensive Back |
| DeMarcco Hellams | Senior | Defensive Back |
| Malachi Moore | Junior | Defensive Back |
| Brian Branch | Junior | Defensive Back |

Special teams

| Player | Class | Position |
|---|---|---|
| Will Reichard | Senior | Kicker |
| James Burnip | Sophomore | Punter |

† Indicates player was a starter in 2021 but missed all of 2022 due to injury.

== Preseason ==
=== Spring game ===
The Crimson Tide are scheduled to hold spring practices in March and April 2022 with the Alabama football spring game, "A-Day" to take place in Tuscaloosa, AL on April 16, 2022.

2022 A-Day Spring Game

| Quarter | 1 | 2 | 3 | 4 | Total |
|---|---|---|---|---|---|
| BAMA White | 3 | 13 | 3 | 6 | 25 |
| BAMA Crimson | 0 | 0 | 7 | 0 | 7 |

at Bryant Denny Stadium, Tuscaloosa, AL

- Date: April 16, 2022
- Game time: 2:00 pm CDT

=== Award watch lists ===
Listed in the order that they were released

| Award | Player | Position | Year | Source |
|---|---|---|---|---|
| Lott Trophy | Will Anderson Jr. | LB | Jr. | |
| Lott Trophy | Jordan Battle | DB | Sr. | |
| Lott Trophy | Henry To'oTo'o | LB | Sr. | |
| Dodd Trophy | Nick Saban | HC | — | |
| Maxwell Award | Bryce Young | QB | Jr. | |
| Maxwell Award | Will Anderson Jr. | LB | Jr. | |
| Davey O'Brien Award | Bryce Young | QB | Jr. | |
| Biletnikoff Award | Jermaine Burton | WR | Jr. | |
| John Mackey Award | Cameron Latu | TE | RS Sr. | |
| Butkus Award | Henry To'oTo'o | LB | Sr. | |
| Butkus Award | Jaylen Moody | LB | RS Sr. | |
| Jim Thorpe Award | Jordan Battle | DB | Sr. | |
| Bronko Nagurski Trophy | Elias Ricks | DB | Jr. | |
| Bronko Nagurski Trophy | Jordan Battle | DB | Sr. | |
| Bronko Nagurski Trophy | Will Anderson Jr. | LB | Jr. | |
| Bronko Nagurski Trophy | Henry To'oto'o | LB | Sr. | |
| Outland Trophy | Emil Ekiyor Jr. | OL | RS Sr. | |
| Outland Trophy | Justin Eboigbe | DT | Sr. | |
| Lou Groza Award | Will Reichard | PK | Sr. | |
| Paul Hornung Award | Jahmyr Gibbs | RB | Jr. | |
| Wuerffel Trophy | Jordan Battle | DB | Sr. | |
| Walter Camp Award | Bryce Young | QB | Jr. | |
| Walter Camp Award | Eli Ricks | CB | Jr. | |
| Walter Camp Award | Will Anderson Jr. | LB | Jr. | |
| Bednarik Award | Henry To'oto'o | LB | Sr. | |
| Bednarik Award | Jordan Battle | CB | Sr. | |
| Bednarik Award | Will Anderson Jr. | LB | Jr. | |
| Rotary Lombardi Award | Henry To'oto'o | LB | Sr. | |
| Rotary Lombardi Award | Will Anderson Jr. | LB | Jr. | |
| Earl Campbell Tyler Rose Award | Jase McClellan | RB | Jr. | |
| Polynesian College Football Player Of The Year Award | Cameron Latu | TE | RS Sr. | |
| Polynesian College Football Player Of The Year Award | Henry To'oto'o | LB | Sr. | |
| Manning Award | Bryce Young | QB | Jr. | |
| Johnny Unitas Golden Arm Award | Bryce Young | QB | Jr. | |

=== SEC media days ===
The 2022 SEC Media days were held on July 18–21, 2022 at College Football Hall of Fame and The Omni Atlanta Hotel at CNN Center in Atlanta, GA with Nick Saban (HC), Bryce Young (QB), Jordan Battle (DL) and Will Anderson Jr. (LB). The Preseason Polls were released July 22, 2022. Each team had their head coach available to talk to the media at the event. Coverage of the event was televised on SEC Network and ESPN.

Media poll (West Division)
| Predicted finish | Team | Votes (1st place) |
| 1 | Alabama | 177 |
| 2 | Texas A&M | 3 |
| 3 | Arkansas | 1 |
| 4 | Ole Miss | |
| 5 | LSU | |
| 6 | Mississippi State | |
| 7 | Auburn | |

Media poll (SEC Championship)
| Rank | Team | Votes |
| 1 | Alabama | 158 |
| 2 | Georgia | 18 |
| 3 | South Carolina | 3 |

=== Preseason All-SEC ===
==== Media ====
First Team

| Position | Player | Class | Team |
|---|---|---|---|
Offense
| QB | Bryce Young | Junior | Alabama |
| RB | Jahmyr Gibbs | Junior | Alabama |
| WR | Jermaine Burton | Junior | Alabama |
| OL | Emil Ekiyor Jr. | RS Senior | Alabama |
Defense
| LB | Will Anderson Jr. | Junior | Alabama |
| LB | Henry To'oTo'o | Senior | Alabama |
| DB | Jordan Battle | Senior | Alabama |
| DB | Elias Ricks | Junior | Alabama |
Special teams
| PK | Will Reichard | Senior | Alabama |
| RB | Jahmyr Gibbs | Junior | Alabama |

Second Team

| Position | Player | Class | Team |
|---|---|---|---|
Offense
| TE | Cameron Latu | RS Senior | Alabama |
| OL | Javion Cohen | Junior | Alabama |
Defense
| DL | D. J. Dale | Senior | Alabama |
| LB | Dallas Turner | Sophomore | Alabama |

Third Team

| Position | Player | Class | Team |
|---|---|---|---|
Offense
| OL | Tyler Steen | GS | Alabama |
| OL | Kendall Randolph | GS | Alabama |
Defense
| DL | Justin Eboigbe | Senior | Alabama |
| DB | Kool-Aid McKinstry | Sophomore | Alabama |
| DB | Malachi Moore | Junior | Alabama |
Special teams
| WR | JoJo Earle | Sophomore | Alabama |

==== Coaches ====
First Team

| Position | Player | Class | Team |
|---|---|---|---|
Offense
| QB | Bryce Young | Junior | Alabama |
| OL | Emil Ekiyor Jr. | RS Senior | Alabama |
Defense
| LB | Will Anderson Jr. | Junior | Alabama |
| LB | Henry To'oTo'o | Senior | Alabama |
| DB | Jordan Battle | Senior | Alabama |
| DB | Elias Ricks | Junior | Alabama |
Special teams
| PK | Will Reichard | Senior | Alabama |

Second Team

| Position | Player | Class | Team |
|---|---|---|---|
Offense
| RB | Jahmyr Gibbs | Junior | Alabama |
| TE | Cameron Latu | RS Senior | Alabama |
| WR | Jermaine Burton | Junior | Alabama |
Defense
| DL | Malachi Moore | Junior | Alabama |
| LB | Dallas Turner | Sophomore | Alabama |
Special teams
| PK | Will Reichard | Senior | Alabama |
| RB | Jahmyr Gibbs | Junior | Alabama |

Third Team

| Position | Player | Class | Team |
|---|---|---|---|
Offense
| OL | Tyler Steen | GS | Alabama |
| OL | Javion Cohen | Junior | Alabama |
Defense
| DL | Justin Eboigbe | Senior | Alabama |
| DL | D. J. Dale | Senior | Alabama |
| DB | Kool-Aid McKinstry | Sophomore | Alabama |
| DB | Brian Branch | Sophomore | Alabama |
Special teams
| WR | JoJo Earle | Sophomore | Alabama |

=== Preseason All-Americans ===
First Team All-Americans
| Player | No. | Position | Class | Selector(s) | Source(s) |
| Bryce Young | 9 | QB | Junior | AP Sports; Athlon Sports; CBS Sports; CFN; ESPN; PFF; Sporting News; Walter Camp | |
| Dallas Turner | 15 | LB | Sophomore | ESPN | |
| Emil Ekiyor Jr. | 55 | OL | (redshirt) Senior | Sporting News | |
| Eli Ricks | 7 | DB | Junior | AP Sports; CFN; PFF; Walter Camp | |
| Jahmyr Gibbs | 13 | RB | Junior | Sporting News | |
| Jordan Battle | 9 | DB | Senior | AP Sports; Athlon Sports; CBS Sports; CFN; ESPN; Sporting News | |
| Will Anderson Jr. | 31 | LB | Junior | AP Sports; Athlon Sports; CBS Sports; ESPN; CFN; PFF; Sporting News; Walter Camp | |

Second Team All-Americans
| Player | No. | Position | Class | Selector(s) | Source(s) |
| Eli Ricks | 7 | DB | Junior | CBS Sports; Sporting News | |
| Emil Ekiyor Jr. | 55 | OL | (redshirt) Senior | CBS Sports; CFN | |
| Jahmyr Gibbs | 13 | RB (KR) | Junior | AP Sports; Athlon Sports; CBS Sports | |
| Jordan Battle | 9 | DB | Senior | PFF | |

== Personnel ==
=== Roster ===
2022 Alabama Crimson Tide Football
| Quarterbacks: 4 – Jalen Milroe – (redshirt) Freshman (6′ 2″, 212); 9 – Bryce Young – Junior (6′ 0″, 194); 15 – Ty Simpson – Freshman (6′ 2″, 198); 16 – Cade Carruth – Freshman (6′ 1″, 195); 17 – Amanni Stewart – Freshman (6′ 2″, 205); 18 – Zeb Vickery – Freshman (6′ 2″, 195); Running backs: 1 – Jahmyr Gibbs – Junior (5′ 11″, 200); 2 – Jase McClellan – Junior (5′ 11″, 212); 5 – Roydell Williams – Junior (5′ 10″, 212); 6 – Trey Sanders – (redshirt) Junior (6′ 0″, 214); 24 – Emmanuel Henderson – Freshman (6′ 1″, 185); 25 – Jonathan Bennett – Junior (5′ 8″, 180); 26 – Jam Miller – Freshman (5′ 10″, 201); 28 – Michael Lorino II – Freshman (5′ 9″, 185); 29 – Elijah Crockett – Sophomore (5′ 11″, 210); Wide receivers: 3 – Jermaine Burton – Junior (6′ 0″, 200); 7 – Ja'Corey Brooks – Sophomore (6′ 2″, 196); 8 – Tyler Harrell – (redshirt) Junior (6′ 0″, 197); 10 – JoJo Earle – Sophomore (5′ 10″, 177); 11 – Traeshon Holden – Junior (6′ 3″, 214); 12 – Christian Leary – Sophomore (5′ 10″, 175); 13 – Aaron Anderson – Freshman (5′ 9″, 184); 14 – Thaiu Jones-Bell – Junior (6′ 0″, 190); 17 – Isaiah Bond – Freshman (5′ 11″, 175); 18 – Shazz Preston – Freshman (6′ 0″, 190); 19 – Kendrick Law – Freshman (5′ 11″, 193); 30 – Jacoby Boykins – Sophomore (5′ 11″, 182); 32 – Jay Loper Jr. – Freshman (5′ 11″, 180); 33 – Jack Standeffer – Freshman (5′ 10″, 160); 34 – Mekiel Stewart – Freshman (5′ 11″, 180); 35 – Zarian Courtney – Junior (6′ 2″, 183); 36 – Bret Bolin – (redshirt) Senior (6′ 0″, 176); 37 – Sam Wiloughby – Junior (5′ 10″, 165); 38 – Deshawn Samples – Freshman (5′ 9″, 160); 48 – Steven Harvey Jr. – Freshman (5′ 9″, 155); 80 – Kobe Prentice – Freshman (5′ 10″, 171); 89 – Grant Krieger – Senior (6′ 2″, 192) | Tight ends: 43 – Robert Ellis – Junior (6′ 0″, 220); 44 – Charlie Skehan – Junior (6′ 1″, 232); 45 – Robbie Ouzts – Sophomore (6′ 4″, 258); 48 – Peyton Fox – Freshman (6′ 4″, 225); 49 – Jax Porter – Freshman (6′ 6″, 232); 80 – Adam Thorsland – Sophomore (6′ 5″, 232); 81 – Cameron Latu – (redshirt) Senior (6′ 5″, 247); 84 – Amari Niblack – Freshman (6′ 4″, 225); 85 – Elijah Brown – Freshman (6′ 5″, 238); 87 – Danny Lewis – Freshman (6′ 5″, 255); 88 – Miles Kitselman – Sophomore (6′ 5″, 250); Offensive Lineman: 51 – Tanner Bowles – (redshirt) Junior (6′ 5″, 280); 52 – Tyler Booker – Freshman (6′ 5″, 335); 54 – Tyler Steen – Graduate (6′ 5″, 315); 55 – Emil Ekiyor Jr. – (redshirt) Senior (6′ 3″, 327); 56 – Seth McLaughlin – (redshirt) Sophomore (6′ 4″, 278); 57 – Elijah Pritchett – Freshman (6′ 6″, 300); 58 – James Brockermeyer – (redshirt) Freshman (6′ 3″, 270); 60 – Kendall Randolph – (redshirt) Graduate (6′ 4″, 296) (TE+); 61 – Graham Roten – Sophomore (6′ 3″, 285); 62 – Jackson Roby – (redshirt) Senior (6′ 5″, 285); 63 – Wilder Hines – Freshman (6′ 2″, 240); 65 – JC Latham – Sophomore (6′ 6″, 325); 67 – Braxton Wetzler – Freshman (6′ 0″, 260); 69 – Terrance Ferguson II – (redshirt) Freshman (6′ 4″, 290); 70 – Javion Cohen – Junior (6′ 4″, 305); 71 – Darrian Dalcourt – Senior (6′ 3″, 305); 74 – Damieon George – Junior (6′ 6″, 333); 76 – Tommy Brockermeyer – (redshirt) Freshman (6′ 5″, 292); 77 – Jaeden Roberts – (redshirt) Freshman (6′ 5″, 302); 78 – Amari Kight – (redshirt) Junior (6′ 7″, 322) | Defensive Lineman: 44 – Damon Payne Jr. – (redshirt) Freshman (6′ 4″, 302); 47 – Byron Young – Senior (6′ 3″, 292); 50 – Timothy Smith – Junior (6′ 4″, 304); 57 – Chase Quigley – Sophomore (6′ 1″, 236); 59 – Anquin Barnes – (redshirt) Freshman (6′ 5″, 305); 90 – Tristan Walker – Freshman (6′ 1″, 280); 91 – Jaheim Oatis – Freshman (6′ 5″, 370); 92 – Justin Eboigbe– Senior (6′ 5″, 292); 93 – Jah-Marien Latham – (redshirt) Sophomore (6′ 3″, 278); 94 – D. J. Dale – Senior (6′ 3″, 300); 95 – Monkell Goodwine – (redshirt) Freshman (6′ 4″, 288); 96 – Tim Keenan III – (redshirt) Freshman (6′ 2″, 343); 97 – Khurtiss Perry – Freshman (6′ 2″, 264); 98 – Jamil Burroughs – Junior (6′ 3″, 309); 99 – Isaiah Hastings – Freshman (6′ 4″, 290); Linebackers: 10 – Henry To'oTo'o – Senior (6′ 2″, 228); 15 – Dallas Turner – Sophomore (6′ 4″, 240); 19 – Keanu Koht – (redshirt) Freshman (6′ 4″, 231); 30 – Jihaad Campbell – Freshman (6′ 3″, 225); 31 – Will Anderson Jr. – Junior (6′ 4″, 243); 32 – Deontae Lawson – (redshirt) Freshman (6′ 2″, 225); 34 – Quandarrius Robinson – (redshirt) Sophomore (6′ 5″, 224); 35 – Jeremiah Alexander – Freshman (6′ 2″, 278); 36 – Ian Jackson – (redshirt) Freshman (6′ 1″, 235); 37 – Demouy Kennedy – Junior (6′ 3″, 220); 40 – Kendrick Blackshire – Sophomore (6′ 2″, 233); 41 – Chris Braswell – Junior (6′ 3″, 240); 42 – Jaylen Moody – (redshirt) Senior (6′ 2″, 225); 43 – Shawn Murphy – Freshman (6′ 2″, 224); 49 – Jordan Smith – Junior (5′ 10″, 210); 53 – Vito Perri – Freshman (5′ 11″, 178); 54 – Kyle Flood Jr. – Junior (6′ 0″, 212); 55 – Bennett Whisenhunt – Junior (6′ 1″, 222); 56 – JD Baird – Freshman (5′ 8″, 190); 58 – Christian Johnson – Sophomore (6′ 5″, 230) | Defensive backs: 1 – Kool-Aid McKinstry – Sophomore (6′ 1″, 188); 2 – DeMarcco Hellams – Senior (6′ 1″, 208); 3 – Terrion Arnold – (redshirt) Freshman (6′ 1″, 188); 6 – Khyree Jackson – Senior (6′ 3″, 198); 7 – Eli Ricks – Junior (6′ 2″, 190); 8 – DeVonta Smith – Sophomore (5′ 11″, 180); 9 – Jordan Battle – Senior (6′ 1″, 206); 11 – Kristian Story – (redshirt) Sophomore (6′ 2″, 211); 12 – Antonio Kite – Freshman (6′ 1″, 180); 13 – Malachi Moore – Junior (6′ 0″, 190); 14 – Brian Branch – Junior (6′ 1″, 193); 20 – Earl Little II – Freshman (6′ 1″, 180); 21 – Jake Pope – Freshman (6′ 1″, 190); 22 – Trequon Fegans – Freshman (6′ 2″, 185); 23 – Jahquez Robinson – Junior (6′ 2″, 197); 27 – Rodney Johnson – Freshman (5′ 11″, 169); 29 – Logan Mooney – Freshman (5′ 11″, 175); 33 – Joseph Narcisse II – Junior (6′ 1″, 190); 38 – Marcus Early Jr. – Freshman (5′ 11″, 180); 39 – Josh Austin – Freshman (6′ 2″, 190); 40 – Ty Roper – Freshman (5′ 8″, 189); 45 – Caleb McDougle – Sophomore (5′ 11″, 205); 46 – Chase Davis – Freshman (6′ 1″, 182); 48 – Prince Butler – Freshman (6′ 1″, 200); Placekicker: 16 – Will Reichard – Senior (6′ 1″, 190); 82 – Chase Allen – Junior (6′ 2″, 188); 97 – Reid Schuback – Sophomore (6′ 0″, 185); Punter: 86 – James Burnip – (redshirt) Sophomore (6′ ″, 211); 95 – Jack Martin – Senior (6′ 2″, 207); 98 – Upton Bellenfant – Freshman (6′ 2″, 175); 99 – Nick Serpa – Freshman (6′ 4″, 215); Long snappers: 50 – Gabe Pugh – (redshirt) Junior (6′ 5″, 273); 51 – Kneeland Hibbett – Sophomore (6′ 2″, 245); 52 – Alex Rozier – Freshman (6′ 4″, 220) |
Source and player details, 2022 Alabama Crimson Tide Football Commits (August 28, 2021):

=== Coaching staff ===
| Name | Position | Consecutive season at Alabama in current position |
|---|---|---|
| Nick Saban | Head coach | 16th |
| Bill O'Brien | Offensive coordinator/quarterbacks coach | 2nd |
| Pete Golding | Defensive coordinator/Inside linebackers coach | 4th |
| Charles Kelly | Associate Defensive Coordinator/Safeties coach | 4th |
| Joe Cox | Tight end coach | 1st |
| Robert Gillespie | Running backs coach | 2nd |
| Travaris Robinson | Cornerbacks coach | 1st |
| Eric Wolford | Offensive line coach | 1st |
| Holmon Wiggins | Wide receivers coach | 4th |
| Freddie Roach | Defensive line coach | 3rd |
| Coleman Hutzler | Special teams coordinator/Outside linebackers coach | 1st |
| David Ballou | Strength and conditioning coach | 3rd |
| Drew Svoboda | Senior special assistant to head coach | 1st |
Reference: 2022 Alabama Crimson Tide Football Media Guide

=== Depth chart ===
Defense

FS
DeMarcco Hellams
Brian Branch
DeVonta Smith

| JACK | WILL | MIKE | SAM |
|---|---|---|---|
| Will Anderson Jr. | Jaylen Moody | Henry To'oTo'o | Dallas Turner |
| Chris Braswell | Deontae Lawson | Kendrick Blackshire | Quandarrius Robinson |
| Keanu Koht | Jihaad Campbell | – | Jeremiah Alexander |

SS
Jordan Battle
Malachi Moore
Kristian Story

CB
Kool-Aid McKinstry
Eli Ricks
–

| DE | NT | DE |
|---|---|---|
| Byron Young | D. J. Dale | Tim Smith |
| Justin Eboigbe | Jaheim Oatis | Jamil Burroughs |
| Jah-Marien Latham | Tim Keenan | Damon Payne |

CB
Terrion Arnold
Khyree Jackson
Jahquez Robinson

Offense

WR-X
Jermaine Burton
Tyler Harrell
Isaiah Bond

WR-H
Kobe Prentice
Christian Leary
Emmanuel Henderson

| LT | LG | C | RG | RT |
|---|---|---|---|---|
| Tyler Steen | Javion Cohen | Darrian Dalcourt | Emil Ekiyor Jr. | JC Latham |
| Amari Kight | Kendall Randolph | Seth McLaughlin | Tyler Booker | Damieon George Jr. |
| – | – | – | – | – |

TE
Cameron Latu
Robbie Ouzts
Amari Niblack

WR-Z
Traeshon Holden
Ja'Corey Brooks
Kendrick Law

QB
Bryce Young
Jalen Milroe
Ty Simpson

Key reserves
Offense
Defense
Special teams
Out (indefinitely)
Out (season)
Out (suspended)
Out (retired)

RB
Jahmyr Gibbs
Jase McClellan
Roydell Williams

Special teams
PK Will Reichard
P James Burnip
Jack Martin
KR Ja'Corey Brooks
Jahmyr Gibbs
Jermaine Burton
Terrion Arnold
PR Kool-Aid McKinstry
Jermaine Burton
Brian Branch
LS Kneeland Hibbett
H James Burnip

True Freshman

== Schedule ==
The 2022 Crimson Tide' schedule consisted of 7 home games and 5 away games for the regular season. Alabama hosted four SEC conference opponents Mississippi State (rivalry), Vanderbilt, Texas A&M and arch-rival Auburn for the 87th Iron Bowl to close out the SEC regular season at home and traveled to four SEC opponents, Arkansas, Ole Miss (rivalry), Tennessee (Third Saturday in October) and rival LSU (rivalry) to close out the SEC regular season on the road. Alabama was not scheduled to play SEC East opponents Florida (rivalry), Georgia (rivalry), Kentucky, Missouri, and South Carolina in the 2022 regular season. The Crimson Tide's bye week came during week 9 (on October 29, 2022).

Alabama's out of conference opponents represented the Mountain West, Big 12, Sun Belt and ASUN conferences. The Crimson Tide hosted three non–conference games which were against Utah State from the Mountain West, Louisiana–Monroe from the Sun Belt and closed out the regular season with Austin Peay from the ASUN (FCS) and traveled against Texas (Big 12) in Austin, TX.

| Date | Time | Opponent | Rank | Site | TV | Result | Attendance |
|---|---|---|---|---|---|---|---|
| September 3 | 6:30 p.m. | Utah State* | No. 1 | Bryant–Denny Stadium; Tuscaloosa, AL | SECN | W 55–0 | 98,321 |
| September 10 | 11:00 a.m. | at Texas* | No. 1 | Darrell K Royal–Texas Memorial Stadium; Austin, TX (Big Noon Kickoff / College GameDay) | FOX | W 20–19 | 105,213 |
| September 17 | 3:00 p.m. | Louisiana–Monroe* | No. 2 | Bryant–Denny Stadium; Tuscaloosa, AL | SECN | W 63–7 | 98,433 |
| September 24 | 6:30 p.m. | Vanderbilt | No. 2 | Bryant–Denny Stadium; Tuscaloosa, AL | SECN | W 55–3 | 96,246 |
| October 1 | 2:30 p.m. | at No. 20 Arkansas | No. 2 | Donald W. Reynolds Razorback Stadium; Fayetteville, AR | CBS | W 49–26 | 75,579 |
| October 8 | 7:00 p.m. | Texas A&M | No. 1 | Bryant–Denny Stadium; Tuscaloosa, AL | CBS | W 24–20 | 100,077 |
| October 15 | 2:30 p.m. | at No. 6 Tennessee | No. 3 | Neyland Stadium; Knoxville, TN (Third Saturday in October / College GameDay / SEC Nation) | CBS | L 49–52 | 101,915 |
| October 22 | 6:00 p.m. | No. 24 Mississippi State^{†} | No. 6 | Bryant–Denny Stadium; Tuscaloosa, AL (rivalry) | ESPN | W 30–6 | 100,077 |
| November 5 | 6:00 p.m. | at No. 10 LSU | No. 6 | Tiger Stadium; Baton Rouge, LA (rivalry) | ESPN | L 31–32 ^{OT} | 102,321 |
| November 12 | 2:30 p.m. | at No. 11 Ole Miss | No. 9 | Vaught–Hemingway Stadium; Oxford, MS (rivalry) | CBS | W 30–24 | 65,923 |
| November 19 | 11:00 a.m. | Austin Peay* | No. 8 | Bryant–Denny Stadium; Tuscaloosa, AL | ESPN+/SECN+ | W 34–0 | 99,639 |
| November 26 | 2:30 p.m. | Auburn | No. 8 | Bryant–Denny Stadium; Tuscaloosa, AL (Iron Bowl / SEC Nation) | CBS | W 49–27 | 100,077 |
| December 31 | 11:00 a.m. | vs. No. 9 Kansas State* | No. 5 | Caesars Superdome; New Orleans, LA (Sugar Bowl) | ESPN | W 45–20 | 60,437 |
*Non-conference game; ^{†}Homecoming; Rankings from AP Poll; All times are in Central time

== Game summaries ==
=== Utah State ===
Uniform Combination
| Helmet | Jersey | Pants |

| Team | 1 | 2 | 3 | 4 | Total |
|---|---|---|---|---|---|
| Utah State | 0 | 0 | 0 | 0 | 0 |
| • No. 1 Alabama | 17 | 24 | 14 | 0 | 55 |

- Date: September 3
- Location: Tuscaloosa, AL
- Game start: 6:39 p.m.
- Game attendance: 98,321
- Game weather: 83, Sunny, Wind S @ 7 mph
- Referee: Lee Hedrick
- TV announcers (SEC Network): Tom Hart (play-by-play), Jordan Rodgers (color), Cole Cubelic (sideline)

| Statistics | Utah State | Alabama |
|---|---|---|
| First downs | 7 | 30 |
| Total yards | 136 | 559 |
| Rushing yards | 79 | 278 |
| Passing yards | 57 | 281 |
| Turnovers | 0 | 1 |
| Time of possession | 28:09 | 31:51 |

| Team | Category | Player | Statistics |
|---|---|---|---|
| Utah State | Passing | Logan Bonner | 3/9, 39 yards |
| Utah State | Rushing | Robert Briggs | 10 carries, 28 yards |
| Utah State | Receiving | Brian Cobbs | 2 receptions, 33 yards |
| Alabama | Passing | Bryce Young | 18/28, 195 yards, 5 TDs |
| Alabama | Rushing | Bryce Young | 5 carries, 100 yards, 1 TD |
| Alabama | Receiving | Traeshon Holden | 5 receptions, 70 yards, 2 TDs |

Scoring summary

| Quarter | Time | Drive | | | Team | Scoring information | Score | |
| Quarter | Time | Plays | Yards | TOP | Team | Scoring information | USU | ALA |
|---|---|---|---|---|---|---|---|---|
| 1st | 9:56 | 7 | 44 | 2:52 | ALA | 45-yard field goal by Will Reichard (#16) | 0 | 3 |
| 1st | 5:56 | 7 | 60 | 3:02 | ALA | Jermaine Burton (#3) 5-yard touchdown reception from Bryce Young (#9), Will Reichard (#16) kick good | 0 | 10 |
| 1st | 3:06 | 3 | 34 | 1:31 | ALA | Traeshon Holden (#11) 9-yard touchdown reception from Bryce Young (#9), Will Reichard (#16) kick good | 0 | 17 |
| 2nd | 12:19 | 11 | 82 | 4:27 | ALA | Jermaine Burton (#3) 2-yard touchdown reception from Bryce Young (#9), Will Reichard (#16) kick good | 0 | 24 |
| 2nd | 10:14 | 4 | 77 | 0:55 | ALA | Traeshon Holden (#11) 14-yard touchdown reception from Bryce Young (#9), Will Reichard (#16) kick good | 0 | 31 |
| 2nd | 2:56 | 11 | 51 | 4:44 | ALA | 33-yard field goal by Will Reichard (#16) | 0 | 34 |
| 2nd | 0:15 | 5 | 62 | 0:50 | ALA | Jase McClellan (#2) 8-yard touchdown reception from Bryce Young (#9), Will Reichard (#16) kick good | 0 | 41 |
| 3rd | 13:37 | 3 | 65 | 1:23 | ALA | Bryce Young (#9) 4-yard touchdown run, Will Reichard (#16) kick good | 0 | 48 |
| 3rd | 10:18 | 4 | 44 | 1:54 | ALA | Jase McClellan (#2) 17-yard touchdown reception from Jalen Milroe (#4), Will Reichard (#16) kick good | 0 | 55 |
| "TOP" = time of possession. For other American football terms, see Glossary of American football. | | | | | | | USU 0 | ALA 55 |

=== At Texas ===
Uniform Combination
| Helmet | Jersey | Pants |

| Team | 1 | 2 | 3 | 4 | Total |
|---|---|---|---|---|---|
| • No. 1 Alabama | 10 | 0 | 0 | 10 | 20 |
| Texas | 3 | 7 | 3 | 6 | 19 |

- Date: September 10
- Location: Austin, TX
- Game start: 11:05 a.m.
- Game attendance: 105,213
- Game weather: Sunny
- Referee: Scott Campbell
- TV announcers (FOX): Gus Johnson (play-by-play), Joel Klatt (color), Jenny Taft (sideline)

| Statistics | Alabama | Texas |
|---|---|---|
| First downs | 16 | 25 |
| Total yards | 374 | 371 |
| Rushing yards | 161 | 79 |
| Passing yards | 213 | 282 |
| Turnovers | 0 | 0 |
| Time of possession | 29:16 | 30:44 |

| Team | Category | Player | Statistics |
|---|---|---|---|
| Alabama | Passing | Bryce Young | 27/39, 213 yards, 1 TD |
| Alabama | Rushing | Jase McClellan | 6 carries, 97 yards, 1 TD |
| Alabama | Receiving | Jahmyr Gibbs | 9 receptions, 74 yards, 1 TD |
| Texas | Passing | Hudson Card | 14/22, 158 yards |
| Texas | Rushing | Bijan Robinson | 21 carries, 57 yards, 1 TD |
| Texas | Receiving | Xavier Worthy | 5 receptions, 97 yards |

Scoring summary

| Quarter | Time | Drive | | | Team | Scoring information | Score | |
| Quarter | Time | Plays | Yards | TOP | Team | Scoring information | UA | TEX |
|---|---|---|---|---|---|---|---|---|
| 1st | 9:00 | 11 | 57 | 6:13 | ALA | 52-yard field goal by Will Reichard (#16) | 3 | 0 |
| 1st | 2:51 | 14 | 67 | 5:56 | TEX | 26-yard field goal by Bert Auburn (#45) | 3 | 3 |
| 1st | 2:34 | 1 | 81 | 0:17 | ALA | Jase McClellan (#2) 81-yard touchdown run, Will Reichard (#16) kick kick good | 10 | 3 |
| 2nd | 14:55 | 6 | 75 | 2:39 | TEX | Bijan Robinson (#5) 1-yard touchdown run, Bert Auburn (#45) kick good | 10 | 10 |
| 3rd | 6:37 | 6 | 24 | 3:12 | TEX | 33-yard field goal by Bert Auburn (#45) | 10 | 13 |
| 4th | 12:55 | 12 | 65 | 5:47 | TEX | 24-yard field goal by Bert Auburn (#45) | 10 | 16 |
| 4th | 8:29 | 11 | 75 | 4:26 | ALA | Jahymr Gibbs (#1) 7-yard touchdown reception from Bryce Young (#9), Will Reichard kick good | 17 | 16 |
| 4th | 1:29 | 8 | 44 | 2:26 | TEX | 49-yard field goal by Bert Auburn (#45) | 17 | 19 |
| 4th | 0:10 | 9 | 61 | 1:19 | ALA | 33-yard field goal by Will Reichard (#16) | 20 | 19 |
| "TOP" = time of possession. For other American football terms, see Glossary of American football. | | | | | | | ALA 20 | TEX 19 |

=== Louisiana–Monroe ===
Uniform Combination
| Helmet | Jersey | Pants |

| Team | 1 | 2 | 3 | 4 | Total |
|---|---|---|---|---|---|
| ULM | 0 | 7 | 0 | 0 | 7 |
| • No. 2 Alabama | 28 | 7 | 14 | 14 | 63 |

- Date: September 17
- Location: Tuscaloosa, AL
- Game start: 3:01 p.m.
- Game attendance: 98,433
- Game weather: 85, Sunny, Wind E @ 4 mph
- TV announcers (SEC Network): Taylor Zarzour (play-by-play), Matt Stinchcomb (color), Coley Harvey (sideline)

| Statistics | ULM | Alabama |
|---|---|---|
| First downs | 11 | 23 |
| Total yards | 169 | 509 |
| Rushing yards | 78 | 273 |
| Passing yards | 91 | 236 |
| Turnovers | 1 | 2 |
| Time of possession | 36:23 | 23:37 |

| Team | Category | Player | Statistics |
|---|---|---|---|
| ULM | Passing | Chandler Rogers | 11/21, 96 yards, 1 INT |
| ULM | Rushing | Malik Jackson | 13 carries, 36 yards, 1 TD |
| ULM | Receiving | Zach Rasmussen | 4 receptions, 39 yards |
| Alabama | Passing | Bryce Young | 13/18, 236 yards, 3 TDs, 2 INTs |
| Alabama | Rushing | Roydell Williams | 8 carries, 58 yards, 1 TD |
| Alabama | Receiving | Jahmyr Gibbs | 4 receptions, 65 yards, 1 TD |

Scoring summary

| Quarter | Time | Drive | | | Team | Scoring information | Score | |
| Quarter | Time | Plays | Yards | TOP | Team | Scoring information | ULM | ALA |
|---|---|---|---|---|---|---|---|---|
| 1st | 13:12 | 4 | 75 | | ALA | Traeshon Holden (#11) 33-yard touchdown reception from Bryce Young (#9), Will Reichard (#16) kick good | 0 | 7 |
| 1st | 10:52 | 2 | -3 | 0:35 | ALA | Interception returned 25 yards for touchdown by Will Anderson Jr. (#31), Will Reichard (#16) kick good | 0 | 14 |
| 1st | 8:50 | 3 | -1 | 2:02 | ALA | Malachi Moore (#13) 3 yrd block punt return | 0 | 21 |
| 1st | 4:21 | 4 | 41 | 1:45 | ALA | Bryce Young (#9) 7-yard touchdown run, Will Reichard (#16) kick good | 0 | 28 |
| 2nd | 10:11 | 8 | 57 | 4:50 | ULM | Malik Jackson (#2) 11-yard touchdown run, Calum Sutherland (#31) kick good | 7 | 28 |
| 2nd | 0:52 | 6 | 93 | 1:05 | ALA | Amari Niblack (#84) 15-yard touchdown reception from Bryce Young (#9), Will Reichard (#16) kick good | 7 | 35 |
| 3rd | 8:41 | 4 | 53 | 1:23 | ALA | Jahmyr Gibbs (#1) 37-yard touchdown reception from Bryce Young (#9), Will Reichard (#16) kick good | 7 | 42 |
| 3rd | 4:30 | 5 | 55 | 1:56 | ALA | Roydell Williams (#5) 10-yard touchdown run, Will Reichard (#16) kick good | 7 | 49 |
| 4th | 12:36 | 3 | 8 | 2:17 | ALA | Punt returned 68 yards for touchdown by Brian Branch (#14), Will Reichard (#16) kick good | 7 | 56 |
| 4th | 7:36 | 10 | 49 | 3:17 | ALA | Trey Sanders (#6) 6-yard touchdown run, Will Reichard (#16) kick good | 7 | 63 |
| "TOP" = time of possession. For other American football terms, see Glossary of American football. | | | | | | | ULM 7 | ALA 63 |

=== Vanderbilt ===
Uniform Combination
| Helmet | Jersey | Pants |

| Team | 1 | 2 | 3 | 4 | Total |
|---|---|---|---|---|---|
| Vanderbilt | 3 | 0 | 0 | 0 | 3 |
| • No. 2 Alabama | 14 | 17 | 14 | 10 | 55 |

- Date: September 24
- Location: Tuscaloosa, AL
- Game start: 6:39 p.m.
- Game attendance: 96,246
- Game weather: 81, Sunny, Wind S @ 3 mph
- Referee: Lee Hedrick
- TV announcers (SEC Network): Tom Hart (play-by-play), Jordan Rodgers (color), Cole Cubelic (sideline)

| Statistics | Vanderbilt | Alabama |
|---|---|---|
| First downs | 9 | 34 |
| Total yards | 129 | 628 |
| Rushing yards | 14 | 228 |
| Passing yards | 115 | 400 |
| Turnovers | 0 | 1 |
| Time of possession | 27:43 | 32:17 |

| Team | Category | Player | Statistics |
|---|---|---|---|
| Vanderbilt | Passing | AJ Swann | 13/26, 115 yards |
| Vanderbilt | Rushing | Rocko Griffin | 3 carries, 19 yards |
| Vanderbilt | Receiving | Will Sheppard | 3 receptions, 52 yards |
| Alabama | Passing | Bryce Young | 25/36, 385 yards, 4 TDs |
| Alabama | Rushing | Jase McClellan | 11 carries, 78 yards, 1 TD |
| Alabama | Receiving | Ja'Corey Brooks | 6 receptions, 117 yards, 2 TDs |

Scoring summary

| Quarter | Time | Drive | | | Team | Scoring information | Score | |
| Quarter | Time | Plays | Yards | TOP | Team | Scoring information | VAN | ALA |
|---|---|---|---|---|---|---|---|---|
| 1st | 8:49 | 4 | 68 | 1:16 | ALA | Ja'Corey Brooks (#7) 21-yard touchdown reception from Bryce Young (#9), Will Reichard (#16) kick good | 0 | 7 |
| 1st | 4:06 | 10 | 52 | 5:00 | VAN | 41-yard field goal by Joseph Bulovas (36) | 3 | 7 |
| 1st | 0:35 | 10 | 75 | 3:14 | ALA | Traeshon Holden (#11) 8-yard touchdown reception from Bryce Young (#9), Will Reichard (#16) kick good | 3 | 14 |
| 2nd | 13:22 | 1 | 34 | 0:37 | ALA | Ja'Corey Brooks (#7) 34-yard touchdown reception from Bryce Young (#9), Will Reichard kick good | 3 | 21 |
| 2nd | 4:43 | 9 | 77 | 3:41 | ALA | Jahymr Gibbs (#1) 7-yard touchdown reception from Bryce Young (#9), Will Reichard (#16) kick good | 3 | 28 |
| 2nd | 0:00 | 4 | 58 | 0:33 | ALA | 40-yard field goal by Will Reichard (#16) | 3 | 31 |
| 3rd | 6:55 | 11 | 84 | 5:18 | ALA | 21-yard field goal by Will Reichard (#16) | 3 | 34 |
| 3rd | 2:56 | 6 | 55 | 2:14 | ALA | Jase McClellan (#2) 12-yard touchdown run, Will Reichard (#16) kick good | 3 | 41 |
| 4th | 5:11 | 15 | 87 | 7:25 | ALA | Jamarion Miller (#26) 12-yard touchdown run, Will Reichard (#16) kick good | 3 | 48 |
| 4th | 0:32 | 5 | 53 | 2:56 | ALA | Jamarion Miller (#26) 40-yard touchdown run, Will Reichard (#16) kick good | 3 | 55 |
| "TOP" = time of possession. For other American football terms, see Glossary of American football. | | | | | | | VAN 3 | ALA 55 |

=== At No. 20 Arkansas ===
Uniform Combination
| Helmet | Jersey | Pants |

| Team | 1 | 2 | 3 | 4 | Total |
|---|---|---|---|---|---|
| • No. 2 Alabama | 14 | 14 | 0 | 21 | 49 |
| No. 20 Arkansas | 0 | 7 | 16 | 3 | 26 |

- Date: October 1
- Location: Fayetteville, AR
- Game start: 2:40 p.m.
- Game attendance: 75,579
- Game weather: 76, Clear, Wind NE @ 6 mph
- Referee: Scott Walker
- TV announcers (CBS): Brad Nessler (play-by-play), Gary Danielson (color), Jenny Dell (sideline)

| Statistics | Alabama | Arkansas |
|---|---|---|
| First downs | 17 | 26 |
| Total yards | 555 | 377 |
| Rushing yards | 317 | 187 |
| Passing yards | 238 | 190 |
| Turnovers | 1 | 1 |
| Time of possession | 26:33 | 33:27 |

| Team | Category | Player | Statistics |
|---|---|---|---|
| Alabama | Passing | Bryce Young | 7/13, 173 yards, 1 TD, 1 INT |
| Alabama | Rushing | Jahmyr Gibbs | 18 carries, 206 yards, 2 TDs |
| Alabama | Receiving | Kobe Prentice | 3 receptions, 92 yards, 1 TD |
| Arkansas | Passing | KJ Jefferson | 13/24, 155 yards, 1 TD |
| Arkansas | Rushing | Raheim Sanders | 22 carries, 101 yards, 1 TD |
| Arkansas | Receiving | Ketron Jackson Jr. | 4 receptions, 48 yards, 1 TD |

Scoring summary

| Quarter | Time | Drive | | | Team | Scoring information | Score | |
| Quarter | Time | Plays | Yards | TOP | Team | Scoring information | ALA | ARK |
|---|---|---|---|---|---|---|---|---|
| 1st | 7:48 | 6 | 65 | 2:09 | ALA | Kobe Prentice (#80) 47-yard touchdown reception from Bryce Young (#9), Will Reichard (#16) kick good | 7 | 0 |
| 1st | 2:43 | 7 | 80 | 3:05 | ALA | Bryce Young (#9) 8-yard touchdown run, Will Reichard (#9) kick good | 14 | 0 |
| 2nd | 8:32 | 3 | 17 | 0:45 | ALA | Jalen Milroe (#4) 3-yard touchdown run, Will Reichard (#16) kick good | 21 | 0 |
| 2nd | 2:58 | 10 | 59 | 4:05 | ALA | JoJo Earle (#10) 17-yard touchdown reception from Jalen Milroe (#4), Will Reichard (#16) kick good | 28 | 0 |
| 2nd | 0:26 | 9 | 75 | 2:30 | ARK | Ketron Jackson Jr. (#2) 6-yard touchdown reception from KJ Jefferson (#1), Cam Little (#29) kick good | 28 | 7 |
| 3rd | 7:53 | 7 | 78 | 2:49 | ARK | AJ Green (#0) 13-yard touchdown run, Cam Little (#29) kick good | 28 | 14 |
| 3rd | 1:41 | 12 | 50 | 6:09 | ARK | 22-yard field goal by Cam Little (#29) | 28 | 17 |
| 3rd | 0:25 | 1 | 3 | 0:06 | ARK | Raheim Sanders (#5) 3-yard touchdown run, 2-point run no good | 28 | 23 |
| 4th | 14:12 | 5 | 74 | 1:10 | ALA | Jase McClellan (#2) 3-yard touchdown run, Will Reichard (#16) kick good | 35 | 23 |
| 4th | 12:29 | 1 | 72 | 0:12 | ALA | Jahmyr Gibbs (#1) 72-yard touchdown run, Will Reichard (#16) kick good | 42 | 23 |
| 4th | 7:41 | 13 | 60 | 4:39 | ARK | 34-yard field goal by Cam Little (#29) | 42 | 26 |
| 4th | 7:05 | 2 | 75 | 0:43 | ALA | Jahmyr Gibbs (#1) 76-yard touchdown run, Will Reichard (#16) kick good | 49 | 26 |
| "TOP" = time of possession. For other American football terms, see Glossary of American football. | | | | | | | ALA 49 | ARK 26 |

=== Texas A&M ===
Uniform Combination
| Helmet | Jersey | Pants |

| Team | 1 | 2 | 3 | 4 | Total |
|---|---|---|---|---|---|
| Texas A&M | 0 | 14 | 3 | 3 | 20 |
| • No. 1 Alabama | 0 | 17 | 7 | 0 | 24 |

- Date: October 8
- Location: Tuscaloosa, AL
- Game start: 7:10 p.m.
- Game attendance: 100,077
- Game weather: 65, Sunny, Wind N @ 4 mph
- Referee: Matt Loeffler
- TV announcers (CBS): Brad Nessler (play-by-play), Gary Danielson (color), Jenny Dell (sideline)

| Statistics | Texas A&M | Alabama |
|---|---|---|
| First downs | 18 | 24 |
| Total yards | 323 | 399 |
| Rushing yards | 70 | 288 |
| Passing yards | 253 | 111 |
| Turnovers | 1 | 4 |
| Time of possession | 30:04 | 29:56 |

| Team | Category | Player | Statistics |
|---|---|---|---|
| Texas A&M | Passing | Haynes King | 25/46, 253 yards, 2 TDs, 1 INT |
| Texas A&M | Rushing | De’Von Achane | 16 carries, 62 yards |
| Texas A&M | Receiving | Evan Stewart | 8 receptions, 106 yards |
| Alabama | Passing | Jalen Milroe | 12/19, 111 yards, 3 TDs, 1 INT |
| Alabama | Rushing | Jahmyr Gibbs | 21 carries, 154 yards |
| Alabama | Receiving | Jermaine Burton | 3 receptions, 48 yards, 1 TD |

Scoring summary

| Quarter | Time | Drive | | | Team | Scoring information | Score | |
| Quarter | Time | Plays | Yards | TOP | Team | Scoring information | TAMU | ALA |
|---|---|---|---|---|---|---|---|---|
| 2nd | 11:39 | 8 | 71 | 3:34 | ALA | Cameron Latu (#81) 10-yard touchdown reception from Jalen Milroe (#4), Will Reichard (#16) kick good | 0 | 7 |
| 2nd | 6:33 | 6 | 30 | 2:35 | TAMU | Moose Muhammed III (#7) 5-yard touchdown reception from Haynes King (#13), Randy Bond (#47) kick good | 7 | 7 |
| 2nd | 5:33 | 3 | 75 | 1:00 | ALA | Jermaine Burton (#3) 35-yard touchdown reception from Jalen Milroe (#4), Will Reichard (#16) kick good | 7 | 14 |
| 2nd | 2:12 | 4 | 49 | 1:21 | TAMU | Donovan Green (#18) 3-yard touchdown reception from Haynes King (#13), Randy Bond (#47) kick good | 14 | 14 |
| 2nd | 0:12 | 4 | -4 | 0:26 | ALA | 50-yard field goal by Will Reichard (#16) | 14 | 17 |
| 3rd | 13:03 | 5 | 75 | 1:57 | ALA | Ja'Corey Brooks (#7) 29-yard touchdown reception from Jalen Milroe (#4), Will Reichard (#16) kick good | 14 | 24 |
| 3rd | 5:19 | 5 | 39 | 1:59 | TAMU | 41-yard field goal by Randy Bond (#47) | 17 | 24 |
| 4th | 3:32 | 11 | 53 | 5:43 | TAMU | 45-yard field goal by Randy Bond (#47) | 20 | 24 |
| "TOP" = time of possession. For other American football terms, see Glossary of American football. | | | | | | | TAMU 20 | ALA 24 |

=== At No. 6 Tennessee ===
Uniform Combination
| Helmet | Jersey | Pants |

Third Saturday in October

| Team | 1 | 2 | 3 | 4 | Total |
|---|---|---|---|---|---|
| No. 3 Alabama | 7 | 13 | 15 | 14 | 49 |
| • No. 6 Tennessee | 21 | 7 | 6 | 18 | 52 |

- Date: October 15
- Location: Knoxville, TN
- Game start: 3:39 p.m.
- Game attendance: 101,915
- Game weather: 78, Cloudy, Wind SW @ 12 mph
- Referee: Jason Autrey
- TV announcers (CBS): Brad Nessler (play-by-play), Gary Danielson (color), Jenny Dell (sideline)

| Statistics | Alabama | Tennessee |
|---|---|---|
| First downs | 32 | 29 |
| Total yards | 569 | 567 |
| Rushing yards | 114 | 182 |
| Passing yards | 455 | 385 |
| Turnovers | 1 | 2 |
| Time of possession | 37:29 | 22:31 |

| Team | Category | Player | Statistics |
|---|---|---|---|
| Alabama | Passing | Bryce Young | 35/52, 455 yards, 2 TDs |
| Alabama | Rushing | Jahmyr Gibbs | 24 carries, 103 yards, 3 TDs |
| Alabama | Receiving | Cameron Latu | 6 receptions, 90 yards, 1 TD |
| Tennessee | Passing | Hendon Hooker | 21/30, 385 yards, 5 TDs, 1 INT |
| Tennessee | Rushing | Jaylen Wright | 12 carries, 71 yards |
| Tennessee | Receiving | Jalin Hyatt | 6 receptions, 207 yards, 5 TDs |

Scoring summary

| Quarter | Time | Drive | | | Team | Scoring information | Score | |
| Quarter | Time | Plays | Yards | TOP | Team | Scoring information | ALA | TEN |
|---|---|---|---|---|---|---|---|---|
| 1st | 10:18 | 7 | 56 | 1:58 | TENN | Jabari Small (#2) 1-yard touchdown run, Chase McGrath (#40) kick good | 0 | 7 |
| 1st | 7:59 | 8 | 71 | 2:19 | ALA | Jahmyr Gibbs (#1) 8-yard touchdown run, Will Reichard (#16) kick good | 7 | 7 |
| 1st | 6:43 | 5 | 75 | 1:16 | TENN | Jalin Hyatt (#11) 36-yard touchdown reception from Hendon Hooker (#5), Chase McGrath (#40) kick good | 7 | 14 |
| 1st | 3:59 | 4 | 35 | 1:02 | TENN | Jalin Hyatt (#11) 11-yard touchdown reception from Hendon Hooker (#5), Chase McGrath (#40) kick good | 7 | 21 |
| 2nd | 14:07 | 12 | 73 | 4:52 | ALA | 21-yard field goal by Will Reichard (#16) | 10 | 21 |
| 2nd | 11:41 | 3 | 40 | 1:01 | TENN | Princeton Fant (#88) 2-yard touchdown run, Chase McGrath (#40) kick good | 10 | 28 |
| 2nd | 6:46 | 10 | 84 | 4:55 | ALA | Ja'Corey Brooks (#7) 7-yard touchdown reception from Bryce Young (#9), Will Reichard (#16) kick good | 17 | 28 |
| 2nd | 0:36 | 7 | 39 | 2:08 | ALA | 43-yard field goal by Will Reichard (#16) | 20 | 28 |
| 3rd | 11:11 | 3 | 59 | 1:02 | ALA | Jahmyr Gibbs (#1) 26-yard touchdown reception from Bryce Young (#9), 2-point pass good | 28 | 28 |
| 3rd | | 3 | 75 | 0:55 | TENN | Jalin Hyatt (#11) 60-yard touchdown reception from Hendon Hooker (#5), Chase McGrath (#40) kick no good | 28 | 34 |
| 3rd | 4:27 | 12 | 75 | 5:49 | ALA | Jahmyr Gibbs (#1) 2-yard touchdown run, Will Reichard (#16) kick good | 35 | 34 |
| 4th | 14:01 | 3 | 94 | 0:50 | TENN | Jalin Hyatt (#11) 78-yard touchdown reception from Hendon Hooker (#5), 2-point pass good | 35 | 42 |
| 4th | 8:38 | 10 | 75 | 5:23 | ALA | Cameron Latu (#81) 1-yard touchdown reception from Bryce Young (#9), Will Reichard (#16) kick good | 42 | 42 |
| 4th | 7:49 | 3 | 6 | 0:49 | ALA | Dallas Turner (#15) 11 yrd fumble return, Will Reichard (#16) kick good | 49 | 42 |
| 4th | 3:26 | 11 | 75 | 4:23 | TENN | Jalin Hyatt (#11) 13-yard touchdown reception from Hendon Hooker (#5), Chase McGrath (#40) kick good | 49 | 49 |
| 4th | 0:00 | 3 | 45 | 0:15 | TENN | 40-yard field goal by Chase McGrath (#40) | 49 | 52 |
| "TOP" = time of possession. For other American football terms, see Glossary of American football. | | | | | | | ALA 49 | TEN 52 |

=== No. 24 Mississippi State ===
Uniform Combination
| Helmet | Jersey | Pants |

| Team | 1 | 2 | 3 | 4 | Total |
|---|---|---|---|---|---|
| No. 24 Miss State | 0 | 0 | 0 | 6 | 6 |
| • No. 6 Alabama | 7 | 17 | 0 | 6 | 30 |

- Date: October 22
- Location: Tuscaloosa, AL
- Game start: 6:05 p.m.
- Game attendance: 100,077
- Game weather: 72, Clear, Wind S @ 9 mph
- Referee: Scott Walker
- TV announcers (ESPN): Chris Fowler (play-by-play), Kirk Herbstreit (color), Holly Rowe and Todd McShay (sideline)

| Statistics | Miss State | Alabama |
|---|---|---|
| First downs | 20 | 21 |
| Total yards | 293 | 290 |
| Rushing yards | 62 | 29 |
| Passing yards | 231 | 261 |
| Turnovers | 1 | 0 |
| Time of possession | 30:29 | 29:31 |

| Team | Category | Player | Statistics |
|---|---|---|---|
| Miss State | Passing | Will Rogers | 30/60, 231 yards |
| Miss State | Rushing | Jo'Quavious Marks | 13 carries, 53 yards, 1 TD |
| Miss State | Receiving | Rara Thomas | 8 receptions, 73 yards |
| Alabama | Passing | Bryce Young | 21/35, 249 yards, 2 TDs |
| Alabama | Rushing | Jahmyr Gibbs | 10 carries, 37 yards, 1 TD |
| Alabama | Receiving | Jacorey Brooks | 3 receptions, 74 yards |

Scoring summary

| Quarter | Time | Drive | | | Team | Scoring information | Score | |
| Quarter | Time | Plays | Yards | TOP | Team | Scoring information | MSSU | ALA |
|---|---|---|---|---|---|---|---|---|
| 1st | 3:57 | 6 | 85 | 2:18 | ALA | JoJo Earle (#10) 31-yard touchdown reception from Bryce Young (#9), Will Reichard kick good | 0 | 7 |
| 2nd | 11:38 | 3 | 74 | 1:43 | ALA | Jahymr Gibbs (#1) 19-yard touchdown run, Will Reichard (#16) kick good | 0 | 14 |
| 2nd | 8:19 | 4 | 29 | 1:44 | ALA | Traeshon Holden (#11) 6-yard touchdown reception from Bryce Young (#9), Will Reichard kick good | 0 | 21 |
| 2nd | 2:54 | 10 | 56 | 4:25 | ALA | 50-yard field goal by Will Reichard (#16) | 0 | 24 |
| 4th | 14:49 | 6 | 2 | 2:25 | ALA | 33-yard field goal by Will Reichard (#16) | 0 | 27 |
| 4th | 9:13 | 9 | 52 | 4:03 | ALA | 38-yard field goal by Will Reichard (#16) | 0 | 30 |
| 4th | 0:00 | 15 | 76 | 3:58 | MSSU | Ja'quavious Marks (#7) 1-yard touchdown run, — kick — | 6 | 30 |
| "TOP" = time of possession. For other American football terms, see Glossary of American football. | | | | | | | MSSU 6 | ALA 30 |

=== At No. 10 LSU ===
Uniform Combination
| Helmet | Jersey | Pants |

| Team | 1 | 2 | 3 | 4 | OT | Total |
|---|---|---|---|---|---|---|
| No. 5 Alabama | 0 | 6 | 3 | 15 | 7 | 31 |
| • No. 10 LSU | 0 | 7 | 7 | 10 | 8 | 32 |

- Date: November 5
- Location: Baton Rouge, LA
- Game start: 6:10 p.m.
- Game attendance: 102,321
- Game weather: 68, Sunny, Wind E @ 4 mph
- Referee: Ken Williamson
- TV announcers (ESPN): Chris Fowler (play-by-play), Kirk Herbstreit (color), Holly Rowe (sideline)

| Statistics | Alabama | LSU |
|---|---|---|
| First downs | 25 | 22 |
| Total yards | 465 | 367 |
| Rushing yards | 137 | 185 |
| Passing yards | 328 | 182 |
| Turnovers | 1 | 0 |
| Time of possession | 28:00 | 32:00 |

| Team | Category | Player | Statistics |
|---|---|---|---|
| Alabama | Passing | Bryce Young | 25/51, 328 yards, 1 TD, 1 INT |
| Alabama | Rushing | Jahmyr Gibbs | 15 carries, 99 yards |
| Alabama | Receiving | Jacorey Brooks | 7 receptions, 97 yards, 1 TD |
| LSU | Passing | Jayden Daniels | 22/32, 182 yards, 2 TDs |
| LSU | Rushing | Jayden Daniels | 18 carries, 95 yards, 1 TD |
| LSU | Receiving | Kayshon Boutte | 7 receptions, 51 yards |

Scoring summary

| Quarter | Time | Drive | | | Team | Scoring information | Score | |
| Quarter | Time | Plays | Yards | TOP | Team | Scoring information | ALA | LSU |
|---|---|---|---|---|---|---|---|---|
| 2nd | 9:46 | 4 | 49 | 1:57 | LSU | John Emery (#4) 30-yard touchdown reception from Jayden Daniels (#5), Damian Ramos (#34) kick good | 0 | 7 |
| 2nd | 5:56 | 7 | 63 | 3:50 | ALA | 29-yard field goal by Will Reichard (#16) | 3 | 7 |
| 2nd | 0:00 | 12 | 63 | 3:21 | ALA | 36-yard field goal by Will Reichard (#16) | 6 | 7 |
| 3rd | 8:11 | 15 | 55 | 6:49 | ALA | 38-yard field goal by Will Reichard (#16) | 9 | 7 |
| 3rd | 3:30 | 11 | 75 | 4:41 | LSU | Josh Williams (#27) 2-yard touchdown run, Damian Ramos (#34) kick good | 9 | 14 |
| 4th | 12:37 | 8 | 76 | 2:24 | ALA | Roydell Williams (#5) 2-yard touchdown run, 2-point pass No good | 15 | 14 |
| 4th | 6:52 | 11 | 69 | 5:45 | LSU | 32-yard field goal by Damian Ramos (#34) | 15 | 17 |
| 4th | 4:44 | 6 | 65 | 2:08 | ALA | Ja'Corey Brooks (#7) 41-yard touchdown reception from Bryce Young (#9), 2-point pass no good | 21 | 17 |
| 4th | 1:41 | 7 | 75 | 2:57 | LSU | Mason Taylor (#86) 7-yard touchdown reception from Jayden Daniels (#5), Damian Ramos (#34) kick good | 21 | 24 |
| 4th | 0:21 | 10 | 47 | 1:26 | ALA | 46-yard field goal by Will Reichard (#16) | 24 | 24 |
| OT | 0:00 | 7 | 25 | 0:00 | ALA | Roydell Williams (#5) 1-yard touchdown run, Will Reichard (#16) kick good | 31 | 24 |
| OT | 0:00 | 1 | 25 | 0:00 | LSU | Jayden Daniels (#5) 25-yard touchdown run, 2-point pass good | 31 | 32 |
| "TOP" = time of possession. For other American football terms, see Glossary of American football. | | | | | | | ALA 31 | LSU 32 |

=== At No. 11 Ole Miss ===
Uniform Combination
| Helmet | Jersey | Pants |

| Team | 1 | 2 | 3 | 4 | Total |
|---|---|---|---|---|---|
| • No. 9 Alabama | 0 | 14 | 10 | 6 | 30 |
| No. 11 Ole Miss | 7 | 10 | 7 | 0 | 24 |

- Date: November 12
- Location: Oxford, MS
- Game start: 2:46 p.m.
- Game attendance: 65,923
- Game weather: 39, Cloudy, Wind NW @ 12 mph
- Referee: Matt Loeffler
- TV announcers (CBS): Brad Nessler (play-by-play), Gary Danielson (color), Jenny Dell (sideline)

| Statistics | Alabama | Ole Miss |
|---|---|---|
| First downs | 18 | 22 |
| Total yards | 317 | 403 |
| Rushing yards | 108 | 191 |
| Passing yards | 209 | 212 |
| Turnovers | 1 | 1 |
| Time of possession | 31:23 | 28:37 |

| Team | Category | Player | Statistics |
|---|---|---|---|
| Alabama | Passing | Bryce Young | 21/33, 209 yards, 3 TDs |
| Alabama | Rushing | Jase McClellan | 19 carries, 84 yards |
| Alabama | Receiving | Jacorey Brooks | 4 receptions, 61 yards, 1 TD |
| Ole Miss | Passing | Jaxson Dart | 18/31, 212 yards, 1 TD |
| Ole Miss | Rushing | Quinshon Judkins | 25 carries, 135 yards, 2 TDs |
| Ole Miss | Receiving | Malik Heath | 6 receptions, 123 yards |

Scoring summary

| Quarter | Time | Drive | | | Team | Scoring information | Score | |
| Quarter | Time | Plays | Yards | TOP | Team | Scoring information | ALA | MISS |
|---|---|---|---|---|---|---|---|---|
| 1st | 1:43 | 11 | 68 | 4:20 | MISS | Quinshon Jenkins (#4) 1-yard touchdown run, Jonathan Cruz (#14) kick good | 0 | 7 |
| 2nd | 12:07 | 9 | 32 | 2:53 | MISS | 22-yard field goal by Jonathan Cruz (#14) | 0 | 10 |
| 2nd | 8:55 | 7 | 80 | 3:06 | ALA | Jermaine Burton (#3) 19-yard touchdown reception from Bryce Young (#9), Will Reichard (#16) kick good | 7 | 10 |
| 2nd | 5:09 | 7 | 51 | 2:43 | MISS | Quinshon Jenkins (#4) 1-yard touchdown run, Jonathan Cruz (#14) kick good | 7 | 17 |
| 2nd | 0:08 | 6 | 23 | 2:15 | ALA | Cameron Latu (#81) 8-yard touchdown reception from Bryce Young (#9), Will Reichard (#16) kick good | 14 | 17 |
| 3rd | 12:31 | 7 | 54 | 2:29 | ALA | 39-yard field goal by Will Reichard (#16) | 17 | 17 |
| 3rd | 7:28 | 11 | 75 | 5:03 | MISS | Jonathan Mingo (#1) 3-yard touchdown reception from Jaxson Dart (#2), Jonathan Cruz (#14) kick good | 17 | 24 |
| 3rd | 1:23 | 14 | 75 | 6:05 | ALA | Ja'Corey Brooks (#7) 5-yard touchdown reception from Bryce Young (#9), Will Reichard (#16) kick good | 24 | 24 |
| 4th | 11:19 | 8 | 44 | 2:52 | ALA | 23-yard field goal by Will Reichard (#16) | 27 | 24 |
| 4th | 2:34 | 9 | 28 | 4:04 | ALA | 49-yard field goal by Will Reichard (#16) | 30 | 24 |
| "TOP" = time of possession. For other American football terms, see Glossary of American football. | | | | | | | ALA 30 | MISS 24 |

=== Austin Peay ===
Uniform Combination
| Helmet | Jersey | Pants |

| Team | 1 | 2 | 3 | 4 | Total |
|---|---|---|---|---|---|
| Austin Peay | 0 | 0 | 0 | 0 | 0 |
| • No. 8 Alabama | 7 | 10 | 10 | 7 | 34 |

- Date: November 19
- Location: Tuscaloosa, AL
- Game start: 11:02 a.m.
- Game attendance: 99,639
- Game weather: 49, Sunny, Wind NW @ 3 mph
- Referee: Kyle Olson
- TV announcers (ESPN+/SECN+): Mike Morgan (play-by-play), Dave Steckel (color), Lauren Sisler (sideline)

| Statistics | Austin Peay | Alabama |
|---|---|---|
| First downs | 12 | 27 |
| Total yards | 206 | 527 |
| Rushing yards | 59 | 263 |
| Passing yards | 147 | 264 |
| Turnovers | 3 | 3 |
| Time of possession | 24:19 | 35:41 |

| Team | Category | Player | Statistics |
|---|---|---|---|
| Austin Peay | Passing | Mike DiLiello | 20/32, 147 yards, 2 INTs |
| Austin Peay | Rushing | CJ Evans Jr. | 14 carries, 51 yards |
| Austin Peay | Receiving | Drae McCray | 12 receptions, 92 yards |
| Alabama | Passing | Bryce Young | 18/24, 221 yards, 2 TDs |
| Alabama | Rushing | Jase McClellan | 17 carries, 156 yards, 2 TDs |
| Alabama | Receiving | Jermaine Burton | 7 receptions, 128 yards, 2 TDs |

Scoring summary

| Quarter | Time | Drive | | | Team | Scoring information | Score | |
| Quarter | Time | Plays | Yards | TOP | Team | Scoring information | APU | ALA |
|---|---|---|---|---|---|---|---|---|
| 1st | 8:28 | 13 | 92 | 6:28 | ALA | Jase McClellan (#2) 1-yard touchdown run, Will Reichard (#16) kick good | 0 | 7 |
| 2nd | 6:37 | 8 | 80 | 4:35 | ALA | Jermaine Burton (#3) 4-yard touchdown reception from Bryce Young (#9), Will Reichard (#16) kick good | 0 | 14 |
| 2nd | 2:27 | 8 | 34 | 3:09 | ALA | 29-yard field goal by Will Reichard (#16) | 0 | 17 |
| 3rd | 8:43 | 3 | 65 | 0:58 | ALA | Jase McClellan (#2) 9-yard touchdown run, Will Reichard (#16) kick good | 0 | 24 |
| 3rd | 4:57 | 5 | 17 | 2:16 | ALA | 30-yard field goal by Will Reichard (#16) | 0 | 27 |
| 4th | 13:20 | 8 | 66 | 3:29 | ALA | Jermaine Burton (#3) 10-yard touchdown reception from Bryce Young (#9), Will Reichard (#16) kick good | 0 | 34 |
| "TOP" = time of possession. For other American football terms, see Glossary of American football. | | | | | | | APU 0 | ALA 34 |

=== Auburn ===
Iron Bowl

| Team | 1 | 2 | 3 | 4 | Total |
|---|---|---|---|---|---|
| Auburn | 7 | 7 | 7 | 6 | 27 |
| • No. 8 Alabama | 14 | 21 | 7 | 7 | 49 |

- Date: November 26
- Location: Tuscaloosa, AL
- Game start: 2:39 p.m.
- Game attendance: 100,077
- Game weather: 64, Cloudy, Wind SE @ 9 mph
- Referee: Ken Williamson
- TV announcers (CBS): Brad Nessler (play-by-play), Gary Danielson (color), Jenny Dell (sideline)

| Statistics | Auburn | Alabama |
|---|---|---|
| First downs | 21 | 26 |
| Total yards | 395 | 516 |
| Rushing yards | 318 | 173 |
| Passing yards | 77 | 343 |
| Turnovers | 2 | 1 |
| Time of possession | 31:10 | 28:50 |

| Team | Category | Player | Statistics |
|---|---|---|---|
| Auburn | Passing | Robby Ashford | 11/23, 77 yards, 1 TD |
| Auburn | Rushing | Jarquez Hunter | 11 carries, 134 yards |
| Auburn | Receiving | Shedrick Jackson | 2 receptions, 26 yards |
| Alabama | Passing | Bryce Young | 20/30, 343 yards, 3 TDs, 1 INT |
| Alabama | Rushing | Jahmyr Gibbs | 17 carries, 76 yards, 1 TD |
| Alabama | Receiving | Jermaine Burton | 3 receptions, 87 yards |

Scoring summary

| Quarter | Time | Drive | | | Team | Scoring information | Score | |
| Quarter | Time | Plays | Yards | TOP | Team | Scoring information | AUB | ALA |
|---|---|---|---|---|---|---|---|---|
| 1st | 11:11 | 6 | 80 | 3:10 | AUB | Robby Ashford (#9) 24-yard touchdown run, Alex McPherson (#38) kick good | 7 | 0 |
| 1st | 6:25 | 5 | 62 | 2:06 | ALA | Bryce Young (#9) 5-yard touchdown run, Will Reichard (#16) kick good | 7 | 7 |
| 1st | 1:37 | 8 | 65 | 2:52 | ALA | Jase McClellan (#2) 10-yard touchdown reception from Bryce Young (#9), Will Reichard (#16) kick good | 7 | 14 |
| 2nd | 14:56 | 4 | 48 | 1:00 | ALA | Roydell Williams (#5) 5-yard touchdown run, Will Reichard (#16) kick good | 7 | 21 |
| 2nd | 9:34 | 10 | 75 | 5:22 | AUB | Ja'Varrius Johnson (#6) 20-yard touchdown reception from Robby Ashford, Alex McPherson (#38) kick good | 14 | 21 |
| 2nd | 5:39 | 8 | 93 | 3:55 | ALA | Ja'Corey Brooks (#7) 33-yard touchdown reception from Bryce Young (#9), Will Reichard (#16) kick good | 14 | 28 |
| 2nd | 0:54 | 4 | 37 | 1:53 | ALA | Traeshon Holden (#11) 27-yard touchdown reception from Bryce Young (#9), Will Reichard (#16) kick good | 14 | 35 |
| 3rd | 9:57 | 9 | 72 | 5:03 | ALA | Jase McClellan (#2) 2-yard touchdown run, Will Reichard (#16) kick good | 14 | 42 |
| 3rd | 6:39 | 7 | 75 | 3:19 | AUB | Robby Ashford (#9) 14-yard touchdown run, Alex McPherson (#38) kick good | 21 | 42 |
| 4th | 12:18 | 15 | 64 | 7:02 | AUB | 32-yard field goal by Alex McPherson (#38) | 24 | 42 |
| 4th | 2:08 | 10 | 60 | 4:28 | AUB | 39-yard field goal by Alex McPherson (#38) | 27 | 42 |
| 4th | 1:48 | 2 | 27 | 0:20 | ALA | Jahymr Gibbs (#1) 23-yard touchdown run, Will Reichard (#16) kick good | 27 | 49 |
| "TOP" = time of possession. For other American football terms, see Glossary of American football. | | | | | | | AUB 27 | ALA 49 |

=== Vs. No. 9 Kansas State ===
Allstate Sugar Bowl

| Team | 1 | 2 | 3 | 4 | Total |
|---|---|---|---|---|---|
| • No. 5 Alabama | 7 | 14 | 21 | 3 | 45 |
| No. 9 Kansas State | 10 | 0 | 3 | 7 | 20 |

- Date: December 31
- Location: New Orleans, LA
- Game start: 11:10 a.m.
- Game attendance: 60,437
- Game weather: Indoors
- Referee: Larry Smith
- TV announcers (ESPN): Dave Pasch (play-by-play), Dusty Dvoracek (color), Tom Luginbill (sideline)

| Statistics | Alabama | Kansas State |
|---|---|---|
| First downs | 17 | 18 |
| Total yards | 496 | 401 |
| Rushing yards | 175 | 191 |
| Passing yards | 321 | 210 |
| Turnovers | 0 | 2 |
| Time of possession | 24:56 | 35:04 |

| Team | Category | Player | Statistics |
|---|---|---|---|
| Alabama | Passing | Bryce Young | 15/21, 321 yards, 5 TD’s |
| Alabama | Rushing | Jahmyr Gibbs | 15 carries, 76 yards |
| Alabama | Receiving | Jermaine Burton | 3 receptions, 87 yards, 1 TD |
| Kansas State | Passing | Will Howard | 18/35, 210 yards, 2 INT’s |
| Kansas State | Rushing | Deuce Vaughn | 22 carries, 133 yards, 1 TD |
| Kansas State | Receiving | Ben Sinnott | 3 receptions, 48 yards |

Scoring summary

| Quarter | Time | Drive | | | Team | Scoring information | Score | |
| Quarter | Time | Plays | Yards | TOP | Team | Scoring information | ALA | KSU |
|---|---|---|---|---|---|---|---|---|
| 1st | 6:17 | 11 | 38 | 4:45 | KSU | 41-yard field goal by Ty Zentner | 0 | 3 |
| 1st | 3:26 | 1 | 88 | 0:14 | KSU | Duece Vaughn 88-yard touchdown run, Ty Zentner kick good | 0 | 10 |
| 1st | 0:32 | 6 | 69 | 2:54 | ALA | Isaiah Bond 6-yard touchdown reception from Bryce Young, Will Reichard kick good | 7 | 10 |
| 2nd | 11:33 | 6 | 63 | 3:09 | ALA | Cameron Latu 1-yard touchdown reception from Bryce Young, Will Reichard kick good | 14 | 10 |
| 2nd | 0:10 | 7 | 98 | 0:51 | ALA | Jermaine Burton 12-yard touchdown reception from Bryce Young, Will Reichard kick good | 21 | 10 |
| 3rd | 13:54 | 3 | 46 | 1:06 | ALA | Ja'Corey Brooks 32-yard touchdown reception from Bryce Young, Will Reichard kick good | 28 | 10 |
| 3rd | 13:00 | 3 | 17 | 0:08 | ALA | Jase McClellan 17-yard touchdown run, Will Reichard kick good | 35 | 10 |
| 3rd | 6:33 | 8 | 54 | 2:17 | KSU | 28-yard field goal by Ty Zentner | 35 | 13 |
| 3rd | 0:00 | 3 | 51 | 1:32 | ALA | Kobe Prentice 47-yard touchdown reception from Bryce Young, Will Reichard kick good | 42 | 13 |
| 4th | 11:00 | 6 | 19 | 2:31 | ALA | 49-yard field goal by Will Reichard | 45 | 13 |
| 4th | 3:06 | 10 | 71 | 4:27 | KSU | Jordan Schippers 1-yard touchdown run, Ty Zentner kick good | 45 | 20 |
| "TOP" = time of possession. For other American football terms, see Glossary of American football. | | | | | | | ALA 45 | KSU 20 |

== Rankings ==
Ranking movements Legend: ██ Increase in ranking ██ Decrease in ranking ( ) = First-place votes
| | Week | | | | | | | | | | | | | | | |
| Poll | Pre | 1 | 2 | 3 | 4 | 5 | 6 | 7 | 8 | 9 | 10 | 11 | 12 | 13 | 14 | Final |
|---|---|---|---|---|---|---|---|---|---|---|---|---|---|---|---|---|
| AP | 1 (54) | 1 (44) | 2 (9) | 2 (3) | 2 (4) | 1 (25) | 3 (11) | 6 | 6 | 6 | 10 | 8 | 8 | 6 | 5 | 5 |
| Coaches | 1 (54) | 1 (57) | 1 (39) | 2 (24) | 2 (26) | 1 (34) | 1 (35) | 6 | 6 | 6 | 11 | 8 | 7 | 6 | 5 | 5 |
| CFP | Not released | | | | | | | | | 6 | 9 | 8 | 7 | 6 | 5 | Not released |

== Statistics ==
=== Team ===
| | Alabama | Opp |
|---|---|---|
| Scoring | 345 | 133 |
| Points per game | 46.0 | 8.7 |
| Points per Turnovers | 7 | 9.0 |
| First downs | 69 | 43 |
| Rushing | 29 | 14 |
| Passing | 35 | 20 |
| Penalty | 5 | 9 |
| Rushing yards | 712 | 236 |
| Avg per play | 7.5 | 2.1 |
| Avg per game | 237.3 | 78.7 |
| Rushing touchdowns | 5 | 2 |
| Passing yards | 730 | 440 |
| Att-Comp-Int | 67–99–3 | 43–80–1 |
| Avg per pass | 7.4 | 5.5 |
| Avg per catch | 10.9 | 10.2 |
| Avg per game | 243.3 | 146.7 |
| Passing touchdowns | 10 | 0 |
| Total offense | 1442 | 676 |
| Plays | 194 | 190 |
| Avg per play | 7.4 | 3.6 |
| Avg per game | 480.7 | 225.3 |
| Fumbles-Lost | 3–0 | 4–0 |
| Penalties-Yards | 27–200 | 19–165 |
| Avg per game | 66.7 | 55.0 |

| | Alabama | Opp |
|---|---|---|
| Punt-Yards | 10–384 | 27–1101 |
| Avg per play | 38.4 | 40.8 |
| Avg per punt net | 35.4 | 31.3 |
| Punt Return-Yards | 12–258 | 3–10 |
| Avg per punt return | 21.5 | 3.3 |
| Kickoffs-Yards | 25–1587 | 9–564 |
| Avg per play | 63.5 | 62.7 |
| Avg per kick net | 40.5 | 36.4 |
| Kickoff Return-Yards | 4–111 | 5–91 |
| Avg per kickoff return | 27.8 | 18.2 |
| Interceptions-Yards | 1–25 | 3–18 |
| Avg per play | 25.0 | 6.0 |
| Time of possession / game | 28:15 | 31:45 |
| 3rd down conversions | 12/31 | 10/46 |
| 3rd down Pct | 39% | 22% |
| 4th down conversions | 2/5 | 2/4 |
| 4th down Pct | 40% | 50% |
| Touchdowns scored | 10 | 2 |
| Field goals-Attempts | 4–4 | 4–5 |
| PAT-Attempts | 18–18 | 2–2 |
| 2 point conversion-attempts | | |
| Sack by Yards | 7–51 | 4–26 |
| Misc Yards | | |
| Safeties | | |
| Onside kicks | | |
| Red zone scores | 14–15 (93%) | 5–7 (71%) |
| Red zone touchdowns | 12–15 (80%) | 2–7 (29%) |
| Attendance | 196,754 | 105,213 |
| Date/Avg per date | 2/98,377 | 1/105,213 |
| Neutral Site | | |

=== Individual leaders ===
Passing statistics
| # | NAME | POS | RAT | CMP-ATT-INT | YDS | AVG/G | CMP% | TD | LONG |
|---|---|---|---|---|---|---|---|---|---|
| #9 | Bryce Young | QB | 162.1 | 58–85–2 | 644 yrds | 214.7 | 68.2% | 9 TDs | 25 |
| #4 | Jalen Milroe | QB | 156.84 | 8–12–1 | 76 yrds | 38.0 | 66.7% | 1 | 18 |
| #15 | Ty Simpson | QB | 92.0 | 1–2–0 | 10 yrds | 5.0 | 50.0% | — | 10 |
| | TOTALS | | 156.9 | 67–99–3 | 730 yrds | 243.3 | 67.7% | 10 TDs | 38 |

Rushing statistics
| # | NAME | POS | ATT | GAIN | AVG | TD | LONG | AVG/G |
|---|---|---|---|---|---|---|---|---|
| #2 | Jase McClellan | RB | 18 | 167 yrds | 9.3 | TD | 81 | 55.7 |
| #1 | Jahmyr Gibbs | RB | 18 | 151 yrds | 6.9 | — | 58 | 50.3 |
| #9 | Bryce Young | QB | 15 | 144 yrds | 6.9 | 2 TDs | 63 | 48.0 |
| #26 | Jamarion Miller | RB | 11 | 83 yrds | 4.6 | — | 25 | 27.7 |
| #5 | Roydell Williams | RB | 13 | 77 yrds | 5.9 | TD | 16 | 25.7 |
| #4 | Jalen Milroe | QB | 4 | 52 yrds | 13.0 | — | 25 | 26.0 |
| #6 | Trey Sanders | RB | 5 | 40 yrds | 8.0 | TD | 11 | 13.3 |
| #25 | Jonathan Bennett | RB | 2 | 12 yrds | 6.0 | — | 12 | 12.0 |
| | TOTALS | | 95 | 712 yrds | 7.5 | 5 TDs | 81 | 237.3 |

Receiving statistics
| # | NAME | POS | CTH | YDS | AVG | TD | LONG | AVG/G |
|---|---|---|---|---|---|---|---|---|
| #11 | Traeshon Holden | WR | 12 | 169 yrds | 14.1 | 3 TDs | 33 | 56.3 |
| #1 | Jahmyr Gibbs | RB | 14 | 144 yrds | 10.3 | 2 TDs | 23 | 48.0 |
| #80 | Kobe Prentice | WR | 9 | 87 yrds | 9.7 | — | 25 | 29.0 |
| #3 | Jermaine Burton | WR | 8 | 61 yrds | 7.6 | 2 TDs | 16 | 22.5 |
| #81 | Cameron Latu | TE | 7 | 79 yrds | 11.3 | — | 38 | 39.5 |
| #7 | Ja'Corey Brooks | WR | 4 | 62 yrds | 15.5 | — | 29 | 20.7 |
| #2 | Jase McClellan | RB | 3 | 27 yrds | 9.0 | 2 TDs | 13 | 9.0 |
| #17 | Isaiah Bond | WR | 2 | 23 yrds | 11.5 | — | 17 | 23.0 |
| #88 | Miles Kitselman | TE | 2 | 18 yrds | 9.0 | — | 13 | 6.0 |
| #19 | Kendrick Law | WR | 2 | 22 yrds | 11.0 | — | 18 | 22.0 |
| #84 | Amari Niblack | WR | 1 | 15 yrds | 15.0 | TD | 15 | 7.5 |
| #6 | Trey Sanders | RB | 1 | 10 yrds | 10.0 | — | 10 | 3.3 |
| #5 | Roydell Williams | RB | 1 | 7 yrds | 7.0 | — | 7 | 2.3 |
| #12 | Christian Leary | WR | 1 | 6 yrds | 6.0 | — | 6 | 6.0 |
| #45 | Robbie Ouzts | TE | 1 | 5 yrds | 5.0 | — | 5 | 5.0 |
| #8 | Tyler Harrell | WR | — | — | — | — | — | — |
| #24 | Emmanuel Henderson | RB | — | — | — | — | — | — |
| | TOTALS | | 67 | 730 yrds | 10.9 | 10 TDs | 38 | 243.3 |

==== Defense ====
Defense statistics
| # | NAME | POS | SOLO | AST | TOT | TFL-YDS | SACK-YDS | INT-YDS-TD | BU | QBH | RCV-YDS | FF | BLK | SAF |
|---|---|---|---|---|---|---|---|---|---|---|---|---|---|---|
| #1 | Kool-Aid McKinstry | CB | 7 | 1 | 8 | 1–12 yrds | 1–12 yrds | — | 2 | — | — | — | — | — |
| #2 | DeMarcco Hellams | CB | 14 | 7 | 21 | 1—2 yds | — | — | 2 | — | — | — | — | — |
| #3 | Terrion Arnold | CB | 8 | — | 8 | 1—1 yrds | — | — | 2 | — | — | — | — | — |
| #6 | Khyree Jackson | CB | 5 | — | 5 | 1—2 yrds | — | — | — | — | — | — | — | — |
| #7 | Eli Ricks | CB | 2 | — | 2.0 | — | — | — | — | — | — | — | — | — |
| #7 | Ja'Corey Brooks | WR | — | — | — | — | — | — | — | — | — | — | 1 | — |
| #8 | DeVonta Smith | CB | — | — | — | — | — | — | — | — | — | — | — | — |
| #9 | Jordan Battle | CB | 5 | 4 | 9 | — | — | — | — | — | — | — | — | — |
| #10 | Henry To'oTo'o | LB | 5 | 12 | 17 | 2—11 yrds | 1—9 yrds | — | — | — | — | — | — | — |
| #11 | Kristian Story | CB | 2 | — | 2.0 | — | — | — | — | — | — | — | — | — |
| #13 | Malachi Moore | CB | 3 | 5 | 8 | 0.5—2 yrds | 0.5—2 yrds | — | 1 | — | — | — | — | — |
| #14 | Brian Branch | CB | 10 | 7 | 17 | 2—8 yrds | 1—6 yrds | — | 1 | — | — | — | — | — |
| #15 | Dallas Turner | LB | 4 | 4 | 8 | — | — | — | — | 3 | — | — | — | — |
| #19 | Keanu Koht | LB | — | — | — | — | — | — | — | — | — | — | — | — |
| #23 | Jahquez Robinson | CB | — | — | — | — | — | — | — | — | — | — | — | — |
| #24 | Emmanuel Henderson | RB | — | — | — | — | — | — | — | — | — | — | — | — |
| #30 | Jihaad Campbell | LB | — | — | — | — | — | — | — | — | — | — | — | — |
| #31 | Will Anderson Jr. | LB | 7 | 8 | 15 | 4.5—20 yrds | 2—10 | 1—25—1 | — | 1 | — | — | 1 | — |
| #32 | Deontae Lawson | LB | 5 | 5 | 10 | 0.5—1 yrd | — | — | — | — | — | — | — | — |
| #34 | Quandarrius Robinson | LB | — | 1 | 1 | — | — | — | — | — | — | — | — | — |
| #35 | Jeremiah Alexander | LB | — | 1 | 1 | — | — | — | — | — | — | — | — | — |
| #40 | Kendrick Blackshire | LB | 2 | 3 | 5 | 1—5 yrds | — | — | — | 1 | — | — | — | — |
| #41 | Chris Braswell | LB | 2 | 2 | 4 | 1—10 yrds | — | — | — | — | — | 1 | — | — |
| #42 | Jaylen Moody | LB | 9 | 13 | 22 | 2—10 yrds | 1—9 yrds | — | — | 1 | — | — | — | — |
| #43 | Shawn Murphy | LB | 1 | — | 1 | — | — | — | — | — | — | — | — | — |
| #44 | Damon Payne Jr. | DL | — | 2 | 2 | 0.5—1 yrd | — | — | — | — | — | — | — | — |
| #47 | Byron Young | DL | 3 | 6 | 9 | 2—6 yrds | 0.5—3 yrds | — | 1 | — | — | — | — | — |
| #50 | Tim Smith | DL | — | 1 | 1 | — | — | — | — | — | — | — | — | — |
| #91 | Jaheim Oats | DL | 1 | 4 | 5 | 0.5—1 yrd | — | — | — | 1 | — | — | — | — |
| #92 | Justin Eboigbe | DL | 3 | 5 | 8 | — | — | — | — | 1 | — | — | — | — |
| #94 | D. J. Dale | DL | — | 3 | 3 | — | — | — | — | — | — | — | — | — |
| #96 | Tim Kennan | DL | — | 1 | 1 | 0.5—0 yrd | — | — | — | — | — | — | — | — |
| #98 | Jamil Burroughs | DL | — | 1 | 1 | — | — | — | — | — | — | — | — | — |
| #99 | Isaiah Hastings | DL | — | 1 | 1 | — | — | — | — | — | — | — | — | — |
| | TOTAL | | 101 | 96 | 197 | 21—92 yrds | 7—51 yrds | 1—25 yrds—TD | 9 | 9 | — | 1 | 2 | — |

Key: POS: Position, SOLO: Solo Tackles, AST: Assisted Tackles, TOT: Total Tackles, TFL: Tackles-for-loss, SACK: Quarterback Sacks, INT: Interceptions, BU: Passes Broken Up, PD: Passes Defended, QBH: Quarterback Hits, FR: Fumbles Recovered, FF: Forced Fumbles, BLK: Kicks or Punts Blocked, SAF: Safeties, TD : Touchdown

==== Special teams ====
Kicking/off statistics
| # | NAME | POS | XPM-XPA (XP%) | FGM-FGA (FG%) | 1–19 | 20–29 | 30–39 | 40–49 | 50+ | PTS | LNG | KICKS | YDS | AVG | TB | OB |
|---|---|---|---|---|---|---|---|---|---|---|---|---|---|---|---|---|
| #16 | Will Reichard | PK | 18–18 (100.0%) | 4–4 (100.0%) | –/– | –/– | 2/2 | 1/1 | 1/1 | 30 pts | 52 | 22 | 1,423 yrds | 64.7 | 13 | — |
| #95 | Jack Martin | PK/P | – (−%) | – (−%) | –/– | –/– | –/– | –/– | –/– | — | — | 3 | 164 yrds | 54.7 | — | — |
| | TOTALS | | 18–18 (100.0%) | 4–4 (100%) | –/– | –/– | 2/2 | 1/1 | 1/1 | 30 | 52 | 25 | 1,587 yrds | 63.5 | 13 | – |

Punting statistics
| # | NAME | POS | PUNTS | YDS | AVG | LONG | TB | FC | I–20 | 50+ | BLK |
|---|---|---|---|---|---|---|---|---|---|---|---|
| #86 | James Burnip | P | 9 | 384 yrds | 42.7 | 51 | 1 | 4 | 4 | 2 | — |
| #95 | Jack Martin | P/PK | — | — | — | — | — | — | — | — | — |
| | Team | — | 1 | — | — | — | — | — | — | — | 1 |
| | TOTALS | | 10 | 384 yrds | 38.4 | 51 | 1 | 4 | 4 | 2 | 1 |

Kick return statistics
| # | NAME | POS | RTNS | YDS | AVG | TD | LNG |
|---|---|---|---|---|---|---|---|
| #1 | Jahmyr Gibbs | RB | 3 | 93 yrds | 31.0 | — | 57 |
| #7 | Ja'Corey Brooks | WR | 1 | 18 yrds | 18.0 | — | 18 |
| #3 | Jermaine Burton | WR | — | — | — | — | — |
| #3 | Terrion Arnold | CB | — | — | — | — | — |
| | TOTALS | | 4 | 111 yrds | 27.8 | - | 57 |

Punt return statistics
| # | NAME | POS | RTNS | YDS | AVG | TD | LONG |
|---|---|---|---|---|---|---|---|
| #1 | Kool-Aid McKinstry | CB | 10 | 153 yrds | 15.3 | — | 44 |
| #14 | Brian Branch | S | 1 | 68 yrds | 68.0 | TD | 68 |
| #17 | Isaiah Bond | WR | 1 | 34 yrds | 34.0 | — | 34 |
| #3 | Jermaine Burton | WR | — | — | — | — | — |
| | TOTALS | | 12 | 258 yrds | 21.5 | TD | 68 |

=== Scoring ===
Alabama vs Non-Conference Opponents

| | 1 | 2 | 3 | 4 | Total |
|---|---|---|---|---|---|
| Alabama | 62 | 41 | 38 | 31 | 172 |
| Opponents | 3 | 14 | 3 | 6 | 26 |

Alabama vs SEC Opponents

| | 1 | 2 | 3 | 4 | OT | Total |
|---|---|---|---|---|---|---|
| Alabama | 56 | 116 | 52 | 83 | 7 | 314 |
| Opponents | 31 | 52 | 39 | 46 | 8 | 176 |

Alabama vs All Opponents

| | 1 | 2 | 3 | 4 | OT | Total |
|---|---|---|---|---|---|---|
| Alabama | 118 | 157 | 90 | 114 | 7 | 486 |
| Opponents | 33 | 66 | 49 | 52 | 8 | 208 |

== After the season ==
=== Awards and SEC honors ===
Weekly Honors
| Recipient | Weekly Award (SEC) | Week # | Date awarded | Ref. |
|---|---|---|---|---|
| Darrin Dalcourt (OL) | SEC Offensive Lineman Player of the Week | Week 1 | Sep 5 | |
| Will Reichard (PK) | SEC Special Teams Player of the Week | Week 2 | Sep 12 | |
| Will Anderson Jr. (LB) | SEC Defensive Player of the Week | Week 4 | Sep 27 | |
| Jahmyr Gibbs (RB) | SEC Offensive Player of the Week | Week 5 | Oct 3 | |
| Will Reichard (PK) | SEC Special Teams Player of the Week | Week 11 | Nov 14 | |

Southeastern Conference Individual Awards
| Player | Position | Award | Ref. |
|---|---|---|---|
| Will Anderson Jr. | LB | SEC Defensive Player of the Year | |

Individual Yearly Awards
| Player | Position | Award | Ref. |
|---|---|---|---|
| Will Anderson Jr. | LB | Bronko Nagurski Trophy; Chuck Bednarik Award; Lombardi Award; Lott Trophy | |

=== All-Americans ===
All-SEC
| Player | Position | Team |
|---|---|---|
| Will Anderson Jr. | LB | 1st team |
| Henry To'oto'o | LB | 1st team |
| Jordan Battle | CB | 1st team |
| Kool-Aid McKinstry | DB | 1st team |
| Emil Ekiyor Jr. | OL | 1st team |
| Jahymr Gibbs | RB | 2nd team |
| Tyler Steen | OL | 2nd team |
| Javion Cohen | OL | 2nd team |
| Will Reichard | PK | 2nd team |
HM = Honorable mention. Source:

All-SEC Freshman
| Player | Position |
|---|---|
| Tyler Booker | OL |
| Jaheim Oats | DL |
| Terrion Arnold | DB |
HM = Honorable mention. Source:

All-SEC Academic
| Player | Position | Class | Major | Ref. |
|---|---|---|---|---|
HM = Honorable mention. Source:

NCAA Recognized All-American Honors
| Player | AP | AFCA | FWAA | TSN | WCFF | Designation |
|---|---|---|---|---|---|---|
| Will Anderson Jr. | 1 | 1 | 1 | 1 | 1 | Unanimous |
| Brian Branch | 2 | | | | | |
| Jahmyr Gibbs | 3 | | | | | |
| Kool-Aid McKinstry | 3 | | 2 | 2 | | |
| Jordan Battle | | | | 2 | | |
The NCAA recognizes a selection to all five of the AP, AFCA, FWAA, TSN and WCFF first teams for unanimous selections and three of five for consensus selections. HM = Honorable mention. Source:

Other All-American Honors
| Player | Athletic | Athlon | BR | CBS Sports | CFN | ESPN | FOX Sports | Phil Steele | SI | USA Today |
|---|---|---|---|---|---|---|---|---|---|---|
| Will Anderson Jr. | 1 | | 1 | | 1 | 1 | | | | 1 |
| Bryce Young | | | | | | | | | | 2 |
| Jahymr Gibbs | | | | | | | | | | 2 |

=== NFL draft ===
The NFL draft was held outside Union Station in Kansas City, MO on April 27–29, 2023.

Crimson Tide who were picked in the 2023 NFL Draft:

| Round | Pick | Player | Position | NFL team |
|---|---|---|---|---|
| 1 | 1 | Bryce Young | QB | Carolina Panthers |
| 1 | 3 | Will Anderson Jr. | LB | Houston Texans |
| 1 | 12 | Jahmyr Gibbs | RB | Detroit Lions |
| 2 | 45 | Brian Branch | S | Detroit Lions |
| 3 | 65 | Tyler Steen | OT | Philadelphia Eagles |
| 3 | 70 | Byron Young | DT | Las Vegas Raiders |
| 3 | 95 | Jordan Battle | S | Cincinnati Bengals |
| 3 | 101 | Cameron Latu | TE | San Francisco 49ers |
| 5 | 167 | Henry To'oTo'o | LB | Houston Texans |
| 7 | 224 | DeMarcco Hellams | S | Atlanta Falcons |

== Media affiliates ==
=== Radio ===
- WTID (FM) (Tide 102.9) – Nationwide (Dish Network, SiriusXM, TuneIn radio and iHeartRadio)

=== TV ===
- CBS Family – CBS 42 (CBS), CBS Sports Network
- ESPN/ABC Family – ABC 33/40 (ABC), ABC, ESPN, ESPN2, ESPNU, ESPN+, SEC Network
- FOX Family – WBRC (FOX), FOX/FS1, FSN
- NBC – WVTM-TV, NBC Sports, NBCSN

=== TV ratings ===
| Opponent | Outlet | Viewers | Rating |
|---|---|---|---|
| Utah State | SECN | † | † |
| @Texas | Fox | 10.60M | 5.7 |
| Louisiana-Monroe | SECN | † | † |
| Vanderbilt | SECN | † | † |
| @ Arkansas | CBS | 5.83M | 3.2 |
| Texas A&M | CBS | 7.15M | 3.9 |
| @ Tennessee | CBS | 11.56M | 6.1 |
| Mississippi State | ESPN | 3.59M | 1.9 |
| @ LSU | ESPN | 7.58M | 3.9 |
| @ Ole Miss | CBS | 8.71M | 4.8 |
| Austin Peay | ESPN+/SECN | † | † |
| Auburn | CBS | 6.27M | 3.2 |
| Kansas State | ESPN | | |

All totals via Sports Media Watch. Streaming numbers not included. † – Data not available.
