= Emmanuel Henderson =

American football player (born 2003)

Emmanuel Henderson Jr.
No. 84 – Seattle Seahawks
- Position: Wide receiver
- Roster status: Practice squad

Personal information
- Born: March 21, 2003 (age 23); Columbus, Georgia, U.S.
- Listed height: 6 ft 1 in (1.85 m)
- Listed weight: 185 lb (84 kg)

Career information
- High school: Geneva County (Hartford, Alabama)
- College: Alabama (2022–2024); Kansas (2025)
- NFL draft: 2026: 6th round, 199th overall pick

Career history
- Seattle Seahawks (2026–present)*
- * Offseason or practice squad member only

Awards and highlights
- First-team All-Big 12 (2025) (Note: Selected at return specialist.); Third-team All-Big 12 (2025) (Note: Selected at wide receiver.)
- Stats at Pro Football Reference

Emmanuel Henderson Jr. (born March 21, 2003) is an American professional football wide receiver for the Seattle Seahawks of the National Football League (NFL). He played college football for the Alabama Crimson Tide and Kansas Jayhawks and was selected by the Seahawks in the sixth round of the 2026 NFL draft.

== Early life ==
Henderson Jr. was born on March 21, 2003 in Columbus, Georgia. He attended high school at Geneva County High School located in Geneva County, Alabama. During his sophomore year, he rushed for more than 2,000 yards and 46 touchdowns and also had an AHSAA-tying record 6 touchdowns in the return game. Henderson Jr. finished his junior season with 1,447 yards rushing on 147 carries and 20 touchdowns, where he also caught 12 passes for 143 yards. Coming out of high school, he was rated as a five-star recruit, and the number one overall running back, where he committed to play college football for the Alabama Crimson Tide over offers from other schools such as Auburn, Clemson, and Georgia.

== College career ==
=== Alabama ===
During his three-year career at Alabama from 2022 through 2024, he played in 33 games, totaling five receptions for 96 yards, while also returning five kickoffs for 107 yards, and making nine tackles on special teams. After the conclusion of the 2024 season, Henderson Jr. decided to enter his name into the NCAA transfer portal.

=== Kansas ===
Henderson Jr. transferred to Kansas. Heading into the 2025 season, Henderson Jr. was slated to be a starting receiver and one the Jayhawks' top players. In week one of the 2025 season, he hauled in six passes for 130 yards and two touchdowns in a win over Wagner. In week four, Henderson notched six receptions for 38 yards, while returning two kickoffs for 137 yards and a touchdown in a win over West Virginia, where for his performance he was named the Big-12 Special Teams Player of the Week.

== Professional career ==
Pre-draft measurables
| Height | Weight | Arm length | Hand span | Wingspan | 40-yard dash | 10-yard split | 20-yard split | 20-yard shuttle | Three-cone drill | Vertical jump | Broad jump |
|---|---|---|---|---|---|---|---|---|---|---|---|
| 6 ft 0 7/8 in (1.85 m) | 185 lb (84 kg) | 31 in (0.79 m) | 8 3/8 in (0.21 m) | 6 ft 5 1/8 in (1.96 m) | 4.44 s | 1.56 s | 2.59 s | 4.33 s | 7.34 s | 35.0 in (0.89 m) | 10 ft 0 in (3.05 m) |
All values from NFL Combine/Pro Day

Henderson was selected by the Seattle Seahawks in the sixth round with the 199th overall pick in the 2026 NFL draft. He was waived by Seattle on August 30 as a part of final roster cuts, and re-signed a day later to the practice squad.

== Personal life ==
Henderson Jr.'s cousin, Javion Cohen, is a guard for the St. Louis Battlehawks of the United Football League (UFL).
