= Jaylen Moody =

American football player (born 1998)

No. 29
- Position: Linebacker

Personal information
- Born: November 6, 1998 (age 28); Conway, South Carolina, U.S.
- Listed height: 6 ft 2 in (1.88 m)
- Listed weight: 225 lb (102 kg)

Career information
- High school: Conway
- College: Alabama
- NFL draft: 2023: undrafted

Career history
- 2023: Cincinnati Bengals*
- 2023: Saskatchewan Roughriders
- 2024: Montreal Alouettes*
- * Offseason or practice squad member only

Awards and highlights
- CFP national champion (2020)
- Stats at CFL.ca

Jaylen Moody (born November 6, 1998) is an American former football linebacker. He played college football at Alabama. He was a member of the Cincinnati Bengals of the National Football League (NFL), and the Saskatchewan Roughriders and Montreal Alouettes of the Canadian Football League (CFL).

== Early life ==
Moody played high school football at Conway High School in Conway, South Carolina. He recorded 105 tackles and three interceptions his senior year.

== College career ==
Moody played college football at Alabama from 2018 to 2022. Alabama won the national championship in 2020. He did not start any games until his senior season in 2022. In 2022, he played in 10 games, starting eight, totaling 50 tackles, two sacks, and one fumble recovery. Moody missed time due to injury in 2022.

== Professional career ==
Moody signed with the Cincinnati Bengals of the National Football League (NFL) on May 12, 2023. He was released on August 29, 2023.

Moody was signed to the practice roster of the Saskatchewan Roughriders of the Canadian Football League (CFL) on October 3, 2023. He was promoted to the active roster on October 11 and dressed for one game, recording no statistics, before being placed on injured reserve on October 20, 2023. He was released on May 11, 2024.

Moody signed with the Montreal Alouettes of the CFL on May 15, 2024. He was released on June 2, 2024.
