= Javion Cohen =

American football player (born 2002)

No. 75 – St. Louis Battlehawks
- Position: Offensive guard
- Roster status: Active

Personal information
- Born: August 8, 2002 (age 24); Phenix City, Alabama, U.S.
- Listed height: 6 ft 4 in (1.93 m)
- Listed weight: 322 lb (146 kg)

Career information
- High school: Central (Phenix City, Alabama)
- College: Alabama (2020–2022); Miami (FL) (2023)
- NFL draft: 2024: undrafted

Career history
- Cleveland Browns (2024); St. Louis Battlehawks (2026–present)

Awards and highlights
- Second-team All-SEC (2022)

Career NFL statistics
- Games played: 1
- Stats at Pro Football Reference

Javion Cohen (born August 8, 2002) is an American professional football offensive guard for the St. Louis Battlehawks of the United Football League (UFL). He played college football at Miami and Alabama.

== Early life ==
Cohen was born in Phenix City, Alabama where he attended high school at Central. Cohen had have a breakout junior season where he played in 13 games, totaling 42 pancake blocks, and grading 91 percent, as he helped his school win their first state title since 1993. Cohen initially committed to play college football for the South Carolina Gamecocks. However, Cohen changed his commitment – first to the Auburn Tigers, then to the Alabama Crimson Tide.

== College career ==
=== Alabama ===
In Cohen's freshman season in 2020 he appeared in five games playing a total of 28 snaps. In the 2021 season, Cohen's role increased as he played in and started 14 games. In the 2022 season, Cohen started in eleven of the twelve games he played splitting time with Tyler Booker. For his performance on the season, Cohen was named second team All-SEC. After the conclusion of the 2022 season, Cohen entered the NCAA transfer portal.

=== Miami (FL) ===
Cohen transferred to play for the Miami Hurricanes. At the conclusion of the 2023 season, Cohen announced that he would forgo his final season of eligibility and declare for the 2024 NFL draft. Cohen also accepted an invite to the 2024 Senior Bowl.

== Professional career ==
Pre-draft measurables
| Height | Weight | Arm length | Hand span | Wingspan | 40-yard dash | 10-yard split | 20-yard split | 20-yard shuttle | Three-cone drill | Vertical jump | Broad jump | Bench press |
|---|---|---|---|---|---|---|---|---|---|---|---|---|
| 6 ft 4 3/8 in (1.94 m) | 324 lb (147 kg) | 34 in (0.86 m) | 9 7/8 in (0.25 m) | 6 ft 8 1/2 in (2.04 m) | 5.34 s | 1.84 s | 2.96 s | 5.06 s | 8.28 s | 26.5 in (0.67 m) | 8 ft 8 in (2.64 m) | 22 reps |
All values from NFL Combine/Pro Day

=== Cleveland Browns ===
Cohen signed with the Cleveland Browns as an undrafted free agent on May 10, 2024. Cohen was notably among the 53 players to make the Browns' initial Week 1 roster. He was waived on October 8, and signed to the practice squad the next day.

Cohen signed a reserve/future contract with Cleveland on January 6, 2025. On August 24, Cohen was waived by the Browns.

=== St. Louis Battlehawks ===
On January 14, 2026, Cohen was selected by the St. Louis Battlehawks of the United Football League (UFL).
