= Tyler Harrell =

American football player (born 2000)

Profile
- Position: Wide receiver

Personal information
- Born: August 1, 2000 (age 26); Miami, Florida, U.S.
- Listed height: 6 ft 0 in (1.83 m)
- Listed weight: 200 lb (91 kg)

Career information
- High school: Christopher Columbus (Westchester, Florida)
- College: Louisville (2018–2021); Alabama (2022); Miami (2023)
- NFL draft: 2024: undrafted

Career history
- New York Jets (2024)*
- * Offseason or practice squad member only

Tyler Harrell (born August 1, 2000) is an American professional football wide receiver. He played college football at Louisville, Alabama, and Miami.

== Early life ==
Harrell attended Christopher Columbus High School in Westchester, Florida. He committed to the University of Louisville to play college football.

== College career ==
=== Louisville ===
Harrell played at Louisville from 2018 to 2021. During his first three years he had two receptions for 36 yards. In 2021, he had 18 receptions for 523 yards with six touchdowns.

=== Alabama ===
After the 2021 season, Harrell transferred to the University of Alabama. He only played 33 snaps for Alabama as he dealt with a lingering foot injury throughout the season.

=== Miami ===
Harrell transferred to Miami on May 12, 2023.

== Professional career ==
Pre-draft measurables
Height	Weight	Arm length	Hand span	40-yard dash	10-yard split	20-yard split	20-yard shuttle	Three-cone drill	Vertical jump	Broad jump	Bench press
6 ft 0 3/8 in (1.84 m)	193 lb (88 kg)	32 in (0.81 m)	9 1/2 in (0.24 m)	4.27 s	1.50 s	2.48 s	4.20 s	7.14 s	33.5 in (0.85 m)	10 ft 3 in (3.12 m)	9 reps
All values from Pro Day

Harrell signed with the New York Jets as an undrafted free agent on May 3, 2024. He was waived on August 27.
