= Emil Ekiyor Jr. =

American football player (born 2000)

Florida Gators
- Title: Quality control assistant

Personal information
- Born: January 22, 2000 (age 26); Indianapolis, Indiana, U.S.
- Listed height: 6 ft 2 in (1.88 m)
- Listed weight: 315 lb (143 kg)

Career information
- High school: Cathedral (Indianapolis)
- College: Alabama (2018–2022)
- NFL draft: 2023: undrafted

Career history

Playing
- Indianapolis Colts (2023)*; Montreal Alouettes (2024)
- * Offseason or practice squad member only

Coaching
- Georgia Tech (2025) Quality control assistant; Florida (2026–present) Quality control assistant

Awards and highlights
- First-team All-SEC (2022)
- Stats at Pro Football Reference

Emil Ekiyor Jr. (born January 22, 2000) is an American football offensive guard who is currently a quality control assistant at Florida. He played college football at Alabama, and signed with the Indianapolis Colts as an undrafted free agent in 2023.

== Early life ==
Ekiyor attended Cathedral High School in Indianapolis, Indiana. He was selected to play in the 2018 U.S. Army All-American Game. He originally committed to the University of Michigan to play college football before switching to the University of Alabama.

== College career ==
Ekiyor played in 12 games as a backup his first two years at Alabama in 2018 and 2019. In 2020, he took over as a starter and started all 13 games. He started all 15 games in 2021 and returned to Alabama as a starter in 2022.

== Professional career ==
Pre-draft measurables
Height	Weight	Arm length	Hand span	Bench press
6 ft 2 1/2 in (1.89 m)	314 lb (142 kg)	33 7/8 in (0.86 m)	9 1/2 in (0.24 m)	23 reps
All values from NFL Combine

Ekiyor signed with the Indianapolis Colts as an undrafted free agent on May 5, 2023. He was waived on August 27, 2023, as part of final roster cuts before the start of the 2023 season.

On May 21, 2024, Ekiyor signed with the Montreal Alouettes of the Canadian Football League (CFL). He was placed on the team's reserve/suspended list that same month.

== Coaching career ==
On January 24, 2025, Ekiyor was hired as a quality control assistant at Georgia Tech.
