= Kendall Randolph =

American gridiron football player (born 1998)

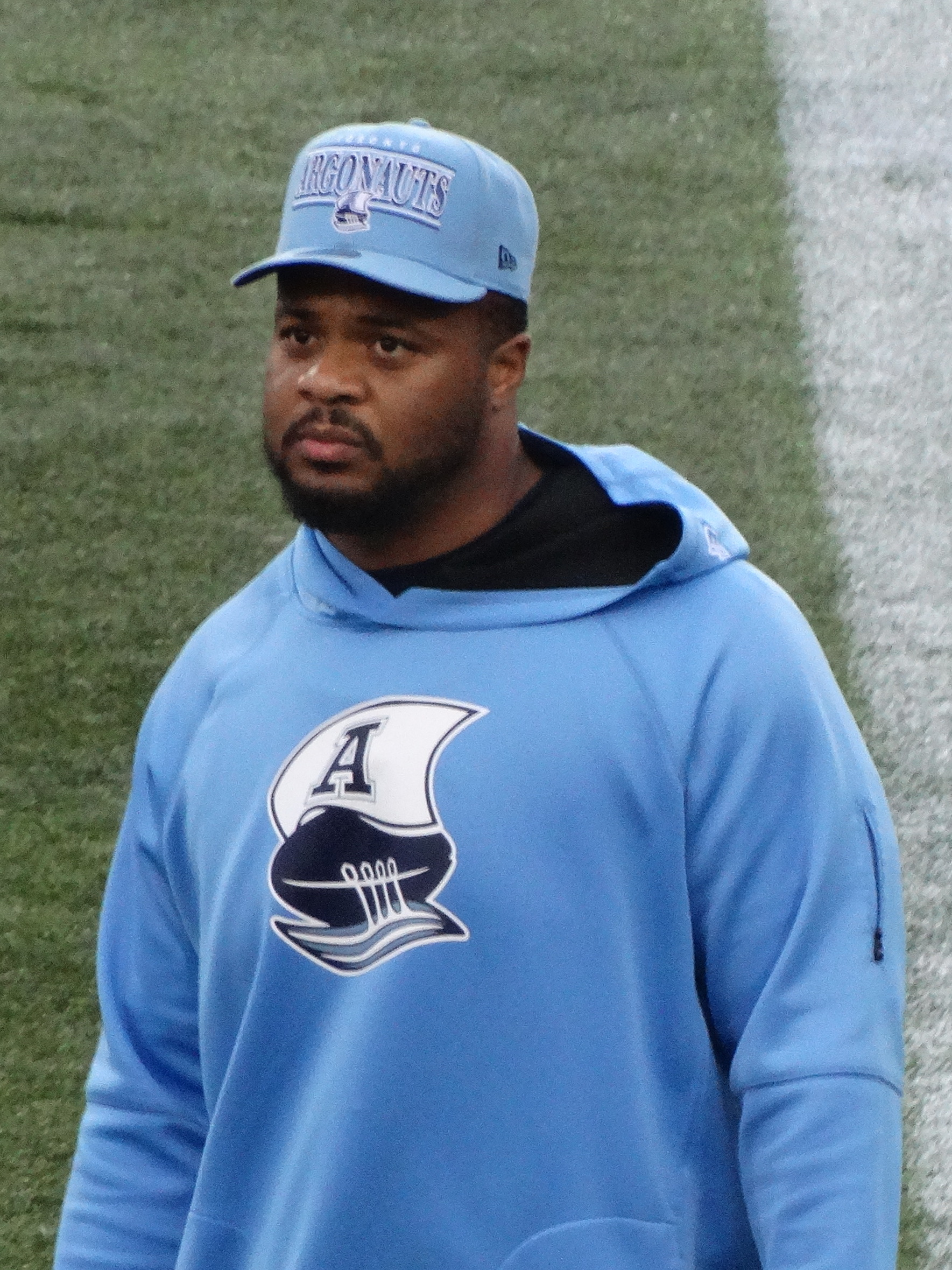
- Randolph with the Toronto Argonauts in 2026

No. 69 – Toronto Argonauts
- Position: Offensive lineman
- Roster status: Active
- CFL status: American

Personal information
- Born: November 14, 1998 (age 27)
- Listed height: 6 ft 5 in (1.96 m)
- Listed weight: 303 lb (137 kg)

Career information
- High school: Bob Jones (Madison, Alabama)
- College: Alabama (2017–2022)
- NFL draft: 2023: undrafted

Career history
- Seattle Seahawks (2023)*; Winnipeg Blue Bombers (2024–2025); Toronto Argonauts (2026–present)
- * Offseason or practice squad member only

Awards and highlights
- CFP national champion (2020)

Career CFL statistics as of 2025
- Games played: 25
- Stats at CFL.ca

Kendall Randolph (born November 14, 1998) is an American professional football offensive lineman for the Toronto Argonauts of the Canadian Football League (CFL). He played college football for the Alabama Crimson Tide where he was the 2020 CFP National Champion. Randolph also had a stint in the National Football League (NFL) with the Seattle Seahawks.

== Early life ==
Randolph was born on November 14, 1998, and grew up in Madison, Alabama, where he attended Bob Jones High School. He was named to the Alabama Sports Writers Association (ASWA) Class 7A All-State Team in his senior year. Randolph was rated a four-star recruit and was ranked No. 198 in the country and No. 7 in Alabama. He committed to play college football at the University of Alabama.

== College career ==
Randolph played college football for the Alabama Crimson Tide from 2017 to 2022. In 2017, he redshirted, his true freshman year, and did not see playing time in 2018. In the 2021 CFP National Championship Game against Ohio State, Randolph played 25 snaps in a 52–24 win. In total, Randolph played in 53 games at guard, tackle and tight end.

== Professional career ==
Pre-draft measurables
Height	Weight	Arm length	Hand span	Wingspan	20-yard shuttle	Three-cone drill	Vertical jump	Broad jump	Bench press
6 ft 4 3/8 in (1.94 m)	300 lb (136 kg)	32 1/2 in (0.83 m)	10 1/2 in (0.27 m)	6 ft 9 5/8 in (2.07 m)	4.87 s	8.06 s	27.0 in (0.69 m)	8 ft 5 in (2.57 m)	23 reps
All values from Pro Day

=== Seattle Seahawks ===
After not being selected in the 2023 NFL draft, Randolph signed with the Seattle Seahawks as an undrafted free agent. He was waived on August 29.

=== Winnipeg Blue Bombers ===
On February 22, 2024, it was announced that the Winnipeg Blue Bombers signed Randolph to the active roster. He made his CFL debut on August 1 against the BC Lions. In his rookie year, Randolph played in six games, starting five times with three at guard and two at tackle.

On May 30, 2026, Randolph was released by the Blue Bombers as part of final roster cuts.

=== Toronto Argonauts ===
On June 2, 2026, Randolph signed with the Toronto Argonauts.

== Personal life ==
Randolph is the son of Levi Sr and Mia. He has two brothers Levi Jr, a professional basketball player and Roderick, a former tight end who played at Alabama A&M.
