= Miles Kitselman =

American football player (born 2002)

No. 84 – Detroit Lions
- Position: Tight end
- Roster status: Practice squad

Personal information
- Born: September 25, 2002 (age 24); Topeka, Kansas, U.S.
- Listed height: 6 ft 5 in (1.96 m)
- Listed weight: 251 lb (114 kg)

Career information
- High school: Lyndon (Lyndon, Kansas)
- College: Hutchinson (2021); Alabama (2022–2023); Tennessee (2024–2025)
- NFL draft: 2026: undrafted

Career history
- Detroit Lions (2026–present)*
- * Offseason or practice squad member only
- Stats at Pro Football Reference

Miles Anthony Kitselman (born September 25, 2002) is an American professional football tight end for the Detroit Lions of the National Football League (NFL). He played college football for the Hutchinson Blue Dragons, Alabama Crimson Tide, and Tennessee Volunteers. He was signed by the Detroit Lions as an undrafted free agent in 2026.

== Early life ==
Kitselman attended Lyndon High School in Lyndon, Kansas. During his senior season, he played as an offensive and defensive lineman, where he notched 99 tackles with ten being for a loss. Coming out of high school, Kitselman committed to play college football for Hutchinson Community College over a partial scholarship from Emporia State.

== College career ==
=== Hutchinson CC ===
As a freshman in 2021, Kitselman brought in two receptions for 16 yards and a touchdown in three games.

=== Alabama ===
After one season at Hutchinson, Kitselman committed to play Division I football for the Alabama Crimson Tide over other offers such as Louisiana and Tennessee. In his two seasons at Alabama in 2022 and 2023, he recorded just two catches for 18 yards in 19 games. After the 2023 season, Kitselman entered his name into the NCAA transfer portal.

=== Tennessee ===
Kitselman transferred to play for the Tennessee Volunteers. In week 2 of the 2024 season, he hauled in three receptions for 39 yards and a touchdown in a victory versus NC State. He finished the 2024 season with 22 receptions for 301 yards and four touchdowns.

== Professional career ==
Pre-draft measurables
Height	Weight	Arm length	Hand span	Wingspan	40-yard dash	10-yard split	20-yard split	Vertical jump	Broad jump
6 ft 5 1/8 in (1.96 m)	251 lb (114 kg)	31 7/8 in (0.81 m)	9 7/8 in (0.25 m)	6 ft 6 1/4 in (1.99 m)	4.90 s	1.71 s	2.83 s	34.5 in (0.88 m)	9 ft 8 in (2.95 m)
All values from NFL Combine

Kitselman was signed as an undrafted free agent by the Detroit Lions after the conclusion of the 2026 NFL draft. He was placed on injured reserve on August 5, 2026, and later released on August 11. On September 28, Kitselman was signed to the practice squad.
