= Eli Ricks =

American football player (born 2001)

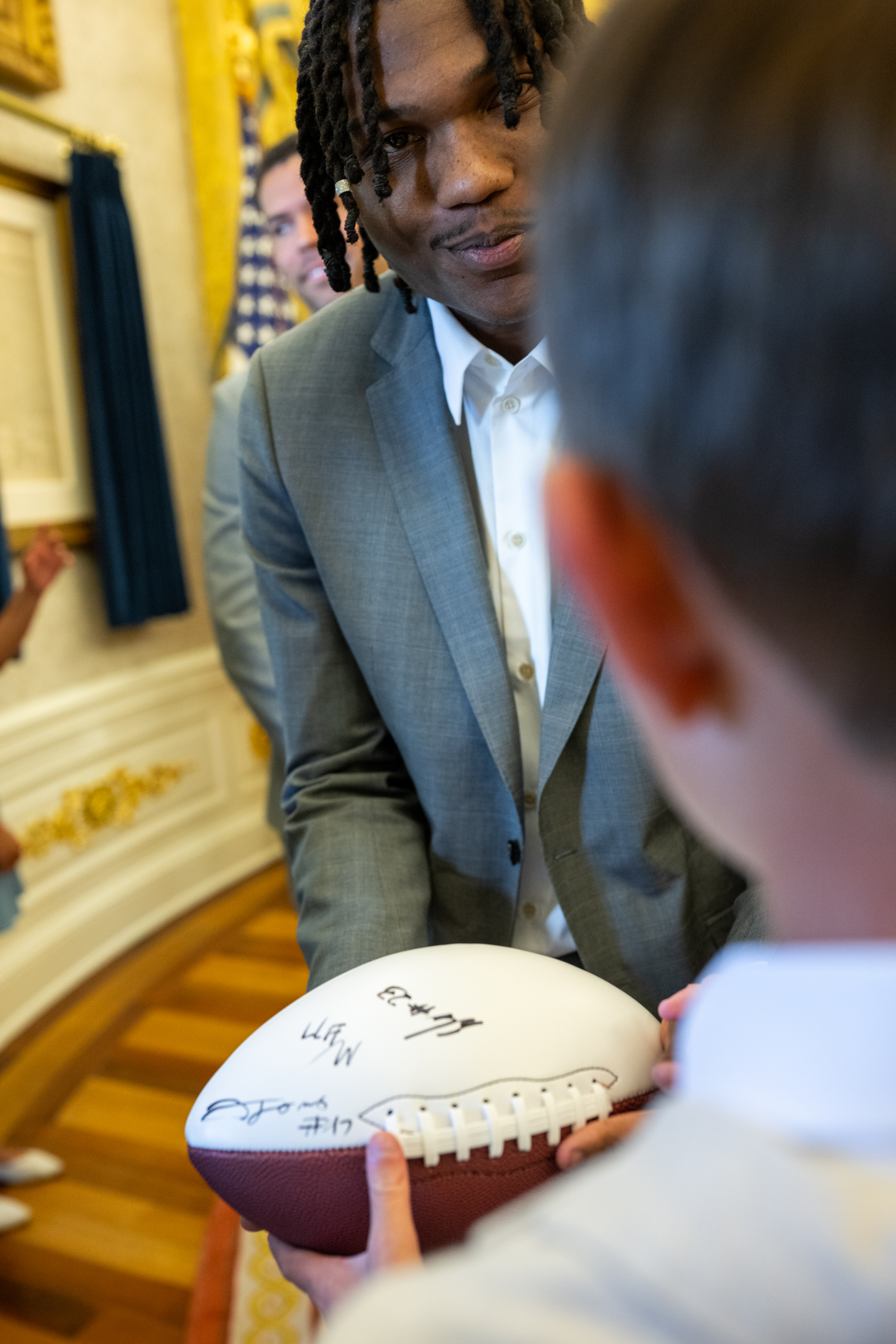
- Ricks in 2025

Profile
- Position: Cornerback

Personal information
- Born: September 26, 2001 (age 25); Rancho Cucamonga, California, U.S.
- Listed height: 6 ft 2 in (1.88 m)
- Listed weight: 188 lb (85 kg)

Career information
- High school: IMG Academy (Bradenton, Florida)
- College: LSU (2020–2021); Alabama (2022)
- NFL draft: 2023: undrafted

Career history
- Philadelphia Eagles (2023–2025)

Awards and highlights
- Super Bowl champion (LIX); Second-team All-SEC (2020)

Career NFL statistics
- Total tackles: 21
- Pass deflections: 3
- Stats at Pro Football Reference

Elias Ricks (born September 26, 2001) is an American professional football cornerback. He played college football for the LSU Tigers before transferring to play for the Alabama Crimson Tide, and was signed as an undrafted free agent by the Philadelphia Eagles after the 2023 NFL draft.

== Early life ==
Ricks originally attended Mater Dei High School in Santa Ana, California before transferring to IMG Academy in Bradenton, Florida, for his senior year. As a senior, he had 14 tackles and three interceptions. Ricks was selected to play in the 2020 All-American Bowl. A five-star recruit, he committed to Louisiana State University (LSU) to play college football.

== College career ==
Ricks was a starter in his true freshman year at LSU in 2020. He finished the year with 20 tackles, four interceptions and two touchdowns.

In 2022, Ricks transferred to the University of Alabama, playing one season before declaring for the 2023 NFL draft where he went undrafted.

== Professional career ==
Pre-draft measurables
Height	Weight	Arm length	Hand span	40-yard dash	10-yard split	20-yard split	Three-cone drill	Vertical jump	Broad jump
6 ft 2 in (1.88 m)	188 lb (85 kg)	32 3/8 in (0.82 m)	8 7/8 in (0.23 m)	4.60 s	1.59 s	2.68 s	7.44 s	35.0 in (0.89 m)	10 ft 7 in (3.23 m)
All values from NFL Combine/Pro Day

After going unselected in the 2023 NFL draft, Ricks was signed as an undrafted free agent by the Philadelphia Eagles on May 5, 2023. On August 29, the Eagles announced that Ricks had made the initial 53-man roster. As a rookie, he played in 16 games and had 19 total tackles and three passes defended. Ricks won a Super Bowl championship when the Eagles defeated the Kansas City Chiefs 40–22 in Super Bowl LIX.

On August 26, 2025, Ricks was waived by the Eagles as part of final roster cuts and re-signed to the practice squad the next day. On September 10, he was released by the Eagles. Ricks was re-signed to Philadelphia's practice squad on September 24. He was released on October 13.
