= Geneva County School District =

School district in Alabama

Coordinates: 31.0405°N 85.8656°W

Geneva County School District is a school district in Geneva County, Alabama, headquartered in Hartford.

== Schools ==
=== High Schools ===
- Geneva County High School
- Geneva Regional Career Technical Center (G-TECH)
- Samson High School
- Slocomb High School

=== Middle Schools ===
- Geneva County Middle School
- Samson Middle School
- Slocomb Middle School

=== Elementary Schools ===
- Geneva County Elementary School
- Samson Elementary School
- Slocomb Elementary School
