= Tyler Booker =

American football player (born 2004)

- Booker in 2025

No. 52 – Dallas Cowboys
- Position: Guard
- Roster status: Active

Personal information
- Born: April 12, 2004 (age 22); New Haven, Connecticut, U.S.
- Listed height: 6 ft 5 in (1.96 m)
- Listed weight: 330 lb (150 kg)

Career information
- High school: St. Luke's School (New Canaan, Connecticut); IMG Academy (Bradenton, Florida)
- College: Alabama (2022–2024)
- NFL draft: 2025: 1st round, 12th overall pick

Career history
- Dallas Cowboys (2025–present)

Awards and highlights
- PFWA All-Rookie Team (2025); 2× first-team All-SEC (2023, 2024)

Career NFL statistics as of Week 6, 2026
- Games played: 20
- Games started: 20
- Stats at Pro Football Reference

Tyler Hunter Devon Booker (born April 12, 2004) is an American professional football offensive guard for the Dallas Cowboys of the National Football League (NFL). He played college football for the Alabama Crimson Tide and was selected by the Cowboys in the first round of the 2025 NFL draft.

== Early life ==
Booker was born on April 12, 2004, in New Haven, Connecticut. He attended St. Luke's School in New Canaan, Connecticut, before transferring to IMG Academy in Bradenton, Florida. Coming out of high school, he was rated as a four-star recruit and the number 39 overall prospect. Booker committed to play college football for the Alabama Crimson Tide over offers from schools such as Florida, Georgia, Oregon, and Ohio State.

== College career ==
As a freshman in 2022, Booker played in 12 games making one start. In week 4 of the 2023 season, Booker was named the SEC offensive lineman of the week for his performance in a win over Ole Miss. During the 2023 season, he started in 12 games for Alabama, allowing just two sacks and four pressures on the year. For his performance, he was named second-team All-SEC.

== Professional career ==
Pre-draft measurables
Height	Weight	Arm length	Hand span	Wingspan	40-yard dash	10-yard split	20-yard split	20-yard shuttle	Three-cone drill	Vertical jump	Broad jump	Bench press
6 ft 4 5/8 in (1.95 m)	321 lb (146 kg)	34 1/2 in (0.88 m)	11 in (0.28 m)	6 ft 11 1/2 in (2.12 m)	5.38 s	1.96 s	3.18 s	4.65 s	7.90 s	27.0 in (0.69 m)	7 ft 10 in (2.39 m)	21 reps
All values from NFL Combine/Pro Day

Booker was selected in the first round with the 12th overall pick in the 2025 NFL draft by the Dallas Cowboys. As a rookie, he started and appeared in 14 games.
