= Alabama Crimson Tide football =

University of Alabama football team

2026 Alabama Crimson Tide football team
- First season: 1892; 134 years ago
- Athletic director: Greg Byrne
- General manager: Courtney Morgan
- Head coach: Kalen DeBoer; 3rd season, 29–10 (.744)
- Location: Tuscaloosa, Alabama
- Stadium: Bryant–Denny Stadium (capacity: 100,077)
- Field: Saban Field
- NCAA division: Division I FBS
- Conference: SEC
- Colors: Crimson and white
- All-time record: 994–346–43 (.734)
- CFP record: 10–6 (.625)
- Bowl record: 46–30–3 (.601)

National championships
- Claimed: 1925, 1926, 1930, 1934, 1941, 1961, 1964, 1965, 1973, 1978, 1979, 1992, 2009, 2011, 2012, 2015, 2017, 2020
- Unclaimed: 1945, 1966, 1975, 1977, 2016

National finalist
- Poll era: 1965, 1971, 1973, 1978
- Bowl Coalition: 1992
- BCS: 2009, 2011, 2012
- CFP: 2015, 2016, 2017, 2018, 2020, 2021

College Football Playoff appearances
- 2014, 2015, 2016, 2017, 2018, 2020, 2021, 2023, 2025

Conference championships
- SoCon: 1924, 1925, 1926, 1930 SEC: 1933, 1934, 1937, 1945, 1953, 1961, 1964, 1965, 1966, 1971, 1972, 1973, 1974, 1975, 1977, 1978, 1979, 1981, 1989, 1992, 1999, 2009, 2012, 2014, 2015, 2016, 2018, 2020, 2021, 2023

Division championships
- SEC West: 1992, 1993, 1994, 1996, 1999, 2008, 2009, 2012, 2013, 2014, 2015, 2016, 2017, 2018, 2020, 2021, 2022, 2023
- Heisman winners: Mark Ingram – 2009; Derrick Henry – 2015; DeVonta Smith – 2020; Bryce Young – 2021
- Consensus All-Americans: 85
- Rivalries: Auburn (rivalry); Tennessee (rivalry); Mississippi State (rivalry); LSU (rivalry); Georgia (rivalry); Ole Miss (rivalry); Georgia Tech (rivalry); Florida (rivalry); Clemson (rivalry); Penn State (rivalry)

Uniforms
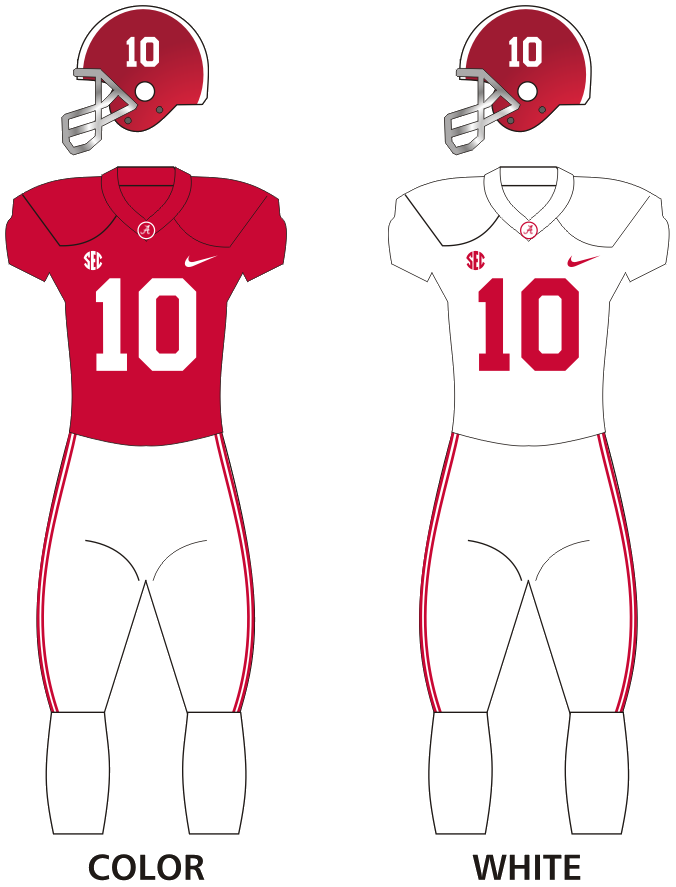
- Fight song: Yea Alabama; Dixieland Delight (unofficial); Sweet Home Alabama (unofficial)
- Mascot: Big Al
- Marching band: Million Dollar Band
- Outfitter: Nike
- Website: rolltide.com

The Alabama Crimson Tide football program represents the University of Alabama (variously Alabama, UA, or Bama) in American football. It is part of the wider Crimson Tide athletics program and competes in the Southeastern Conference (SEC), a conference of the NCAA's Football Bowl Subdivision (FBS).

The Crimson Tide are among the most storied and decorated football programs in NCAA history. It claims 18 national championships, including 13 wire-service (AP or Coaches') national titles in the poll-era and five titles from before the poll-era. From 1958 to 1982, Hall of Fame coach Paul "Bear" Bryant led the program to six national titles. Head coach Nick Saban oversaw another golden era between 2007 and 2023, winning six further national titles. It was not until 2009, however, that running back Mark Ingram II became the first Alabama player to receive a Heisman Trophy. In 2015, Derrick Henry became the university's second Heisman winner. The program achieved two further Heisman Trophies in 2020 and 2021; these were awarded to DeVonta Smith and Bryce Young, respectively.

Alabama has 994 official victories (Note: In 1995, the NCAA forfeited Alabama eight regular season victories and one tie from the 1993 season.) (Note: In 2009, the NCAA vacated 21 victories, including the 2006 Cotton Bowl Classic, from the 2005–2007 seasons.) in NCAA Division I (an additional 21 victories were vacated, and eight victories and one tie were forfeited). Alabama has won 34 conference championships (4 Southern Conference and 30 SEC championships), and has made an NCAA-record 79 postseason bowl appearances. The program has 43 seasons with ten wins or more (plus one vacated) and has 46 bowl victories, both NCAA records. Alabama holds the NCAA record for most consecutive ten win seasons at sixteen from 2008 to 2023. The Crimson Tide lead the SEC West Division with 18 division titles and 16 appearances in the SEC Championship Game. The Associated Press (AP) ranks Alabama fourth in all-time final AP Poll appearances, with 62 through the 2024 season.

Alabama plays home games on Saban Field at Bryant–Denny Stadium, located on UA's campus in Tuscaloosa. Its capacity of 100,077 makes it the tenth largest non-racing stadium in the world and the eighth largest stadium in the United States. The team's rallying cry is "Roll Tide!". Its official fight song is "Yea Alabama", although "Dixieland Delight" is widely sung as an unofficial anthem. The Crimson Tide's fiercest rivalry is with the Alabama-based Auburn Tigers, against whom it contests the Iron Bowl.

== History ==
=== Head coaching history ===
Alabama has had 28 head coaches since organized football began in 1892. Adopting the nickname "Crimson Tide" after the 1907 season, 12 coaches have led the Crimson Tide in postseason bowl games: Wallace Wade, Frank Thomas, Harold D. "Red" Drew, Bear Bryant, Ray Perkins, Bill Curry, Gene Stallings, Mike DuBose, Dennis Franchione, Mike Shula, Joe Kines, and Nick Saban. Eight of those coaches also won conference championships: Wade, Thomas, Drew, Bryant, Curry, Stallings, DuBose, and Saban. During their tenures, Wade, Thomas, Bryant, Stallings, and Saban all won national championships with the Crimson Tide.

Of the 27 different head coaches who have led the Crimson Tide, Wade, Thomas, Bryant, and Stallings have been inducted into the College Football Hall of Fame. The current head coach is Kalen DeBoer, who took over the position in 2024 following the retirement of long-time head coach Nick Saban following the 2023 season.

=== National championships ===
National championships in NCAA FBS college football are debated as the NCAA does not officially award the championship. Despite not naming an official National Champion, the NCAA provides lists of championships awarded by "major selectors." According to the official NCAA 2009 Division I Football Records Book, "During the last 138 years, there have been more than 30 selectors of national champions using polls, historical research and mathematical rating systems. Beginning in 1936, the Associated Press began the best-known and most widely circulated poll of sportswriters and broadcasters. Before 1936, national champions were determined by historical research and retroactive ratings and polls. [...] The criteria for being included in this historical list of poll selectors is that the poll be national in scope, either through distribution in newspaper, television, radio and/or computer online."

Since World War II, Alabama claims only national championships awarded by the final AP Poll or the final Coaches' Poll. This policy is consistent with other FBS football programs with numerous national title claims, including Notre Dame, USC, and Oklahoma, except that in the pre-1936 era, unlike Alabama, there are major selectors' titles that these schools do not claim. All national championships claimed by the University of Alabama were published in nationally syndicated newspapers and magazines, and each of the national championship selectors, and are cited in the Official 2010 NCAA FBS Record Book. In addition to the championships claimed by the university, the NCAA has listed Alabama as receiving a championship for the 1945, 1966, 1975, and 1977 college football seasons.

In Alabama's 1982 media guide, the last for Coach Bryant, 1934 is listed as the only national championship before Coach Bryant in a footnote about the school's SEC history. In the 1980s, Alabama's Sports Information Director Wayne Atcheson started recognizing five pre-Bryant national championship teams (1925, 1926, 1930, 1934, 1941) by adding them to the university's Football Media Guide. According to Atcheson, he made the effort in the context of disputed titles being claimed by other schools, and "to make Alabama football look the best it could look" to compete with the other claimants. Atcheson maintains that the titles are the school's rightful claims. Four of the five championships claimed in the Media Guide come before the AP poll was introduced in 1936. Many schools claim national championships from pre-1936 because there was no contemporary or nationally recognized authoritative source before that year.

The University of Alabama 2009 Official Football Media Guide says Alabama had 12 national championships prior to winning the 2010 BCS National Championship Game. The 2009, 2011, 2012, 2015, 2017, and 2020 titles bring the total number of national championships claimed by Alabama to 18. Thirteen of Alabama's national championships were awarded by the wire-services (AP, Coaches' Poll) or by winning the BCS National Championship Game.

In January 2013, CNN suggested that Alabama might be college football's new dynasty, and in May 2013, Athlon Sports ranked Alabama's ongoing dynasty as the fourth-best since 1934, behind Oklahoma (1948–58), Miami (1986–92), and Nebraska (1993–97).

==== National championship seasons ====
Season	Coach	Selectors	Record	Bowl
1925	Wallace Wade	Various	10–0	W Rose Bowl
1926	Wallace Wade	Various	9–0–1	T Rose Bowl
1930	Wallace Wade	Various	10–0	W Rose Bowl
1934	Frank Thomas	Various	10–0	W Rose Bowl
1941	Frank Thomas	Deke Houlgate	9–2	W Cotton Bowl Classic
1961	Paul "Bear" Bryant	AP, Coaches	11–0	W Sugar Bowl
1964	Paul "Bear" Bryant	AP, Coaches	10–1	L Orange Bowl
1965	Paul "Bear" Bryant	AP	9–1–1	W Orange Bowl
1973	Paul "Bear" Bryant	Coaches	11–1	L Sugar Bowl
1978	Paul "Bear" Bryant	AP	11–1	W Sugar Bowl
1979	Paul "Bear" Bryant	AP, Coaches	12–0	W Sugar Bowl
1992	Gene Stallings	AP, Coaches	13–0	W Sugar Bowl (Bowl Coalition National Championship Game)
2009	Nick Saban	AP, Coaches, BCS	14–0	W BCS National Championship Game
2011	Nick Saban	AP, Coaches, BCS	12–1	W BCS National Championship Game
2012	Nick Saban	AP, Coaches, BCS	13–1	W BCS National Championship Game
2015	Nick Saban	AP, Coaches, CFP	14–1	W Cotton Bowl Classic; W College Football Playoff National Championship
2017	Nick Saban	AP, Coaches, CFP	13–1	W Sugar Bowl; W College Football Playoff National Championship
2020	Nick Saban	AP, Coaches, CFP	13–0	W Rose Bowl; W College Football Playoff National Championship

- 1925 – The 1925 Alabama Crimson Tide football team, coached by Wallace Wade, completed the regular season 9–0–0, winning the Southern Conference championship. Alabama was then invited to play Washington in the January 1, 1926 Rose Bowl. Coach Wade's team initially fell behind the undefeated Huskies, but rallied in the second half to defeat Washington 20–19. The outstanding player of the game was Johnny Mack Brown. This game is viewed by many football historians as the single most important event for Southern football, and is hailed "the football game that changed the South." Alabama was the first Southern football team to be invited to play in the Rose Bowl and proved Southern teams could compete with those from the East, the Midwest and the West coast. The victory for Coach Wallace Wade established Alabama as a football powerhouse. The 1925 Alabama football team finished the season with a 10–0–0 record and was retrospectively selected national champion by William Boand, Richard Billingsley, and the one-man Helms Athletic Foundation. The 2009 NCAA Record Book cites the Michigan Wolverines, Dartmouth Indians, and Alabama Crimson Tide as national champions in 1925.
- 1926 – The 1926 Alabama Crimson Tide football team, coached by Wallace Wade, completed the regular season 9–0–0, winning the Southern Conference championship. Alabama was then invited to play Stanford in the January 1, 1927, Rose Bowl. Coach Wade's team tied the Indians 7–7 to finish the season 9–0–1. The outstanding player of the game was Fred Pickhard. The 1926 Alabama football team was retrospectively selected national champion by Billingsley and the Helms Athletic Foundation. The 2009 NCAA Record Book cites the Lafayette Leopards, Michigan Wolverines, Naval Academy Midshipmen, Stanford Cardinal, and Alabama Crimson Tide as national champions in 1926.
- 1930 – The 1930 Alabama Crimson Tide football team, coached by Wallace Wade, completed the regular season 9–0–0, winning the Southern Conference championship. Alabama was then invited to play Washington State in the January 1, 1931, Rose Bowl. Coach Wade's team defeated the Cougars 24–0 to finish the season 10–0–0. The outstanding player of the game was John Campbell. The 1930 Alabama and Notre Dame teams were selected as "National Champion Foot Ball Teams" by Parke H. Davis in 1934.
- 1934 – The 1934 Alabama Crimson Tide football team, coached by Frank Thomas, completed the regular season 9–0–0, winning the Southeastern Conference championship. Alabama was then invited to play Stanford in the January 1, 1935, Rose Bowl. Coach Thomas' team defeated the Indians 29–13 to finish the season 10–0–0. The outstanding player of the game was Millard "Dixie" Howell. The 1934 Alabama football team was contemporaneously selected national champion under mathematical systems by Dick Dunkel, Deke Houlgate, and the Williamson system. The 2009 NCAA Record Book cites the Minnesota Golden Gophers and Alabama Crimson Tide as national champions in 1934. The University of Alabama honored Ben McLeod Jr., the 95-year–old former backup End of the 1934 team at the September 6, 2008, Alabama–Tulane game.
- 1941 – The 1941 Alabama Crimson Tide football team, coached by Frank Thomas, completed the regular season 8–2–0. Alabama's squad finished third in the Southeastern Conference. After losing to Mississippi State 14-0 and Vanderbilt, 7–0, Alabama finished the regular season ranked No. 20 in the AP poll, which was published on December 1, 1941, before the bowl games, which was customary during that time. The onset of World War II changed the college football postseason. Alabama was one of ten teams chosen for post-season competition when they were invited to play Texas A&M in the January 1, 1942, Cotton Bowl Classic. Coach Thomas' team defeated the Aggies 29–21 to finish the season 9–2–0. Minnesota, the AP national champion, finished 8–0 and did not play in a bowl game per Big Ten rules. Alabama's outstanding players of the game were Holt Rast, Don Whitmire, and Jimmy Nelson. The squad was selected national champion under a mathematical system created by Deke Houlgate, who in later years published the nationally syndicated Football Thesaurus. The 2009 NCAA Record Book cites the Minnesota Golden Gophers, Texas Longhorns, and Alabama Crimson Tide as national champions in 1941.
- 1961 – The 1961 Alabama Crimson Tide football team, coached by Bear Bryant, completed the regular season 10–0–0, winning the Southeastern Conference championship. Led by quarterback Pat Trammell, linebacker Lee Roy Jordan and two–way lineman Billy Neighbors, Alabama outscored their opponents 297–25. Alabama was then invited to play the No. 9–ranked Arkansas Razorbacks in the January 1, 1962 Sugar Bowl. Coach Bryant's team defeated the Razorbacks 10–3 to finish the season 11–0–0. The outstanding player of the game was Mike Fracchia. The 1961 Alabama football team was selected national champion by the AP Poll and Coaches Poll.
- 1964 – The 1964 Alabama Crimson Tide football team, coached by Bear Bryant, completed the regular season 10–0–0, winning the Southeastern Conference championship. Alabama was led by quarterback Joe Namath. Alabama was then invited to play the Texas Longhorns in the Orange Bowl on January 1, 1965. Coach Bryant's team lost to the Longhorns 21–17 to finish the season 10–1–0. The outstanding player of the game was Joe Namath. The 1964 Alabama football team was selected national champion by the AP Poll and the Coaches Poll prior to bowl games. (The AP Poll waited until after the bowl games to select its champion for the 1965 season.)
- 1965 – The 1965 Alabama Crimson Tide football team, coached by Bear Bryant, completed the regular season 8–1–1, winning the Southeastern Conference championship. The Tide lost to Georgia and tied Tennessee during the regular season. Alabama was then invited to play Nebraska in the January 1, 1966 Orange Bowl. Coach Bryant's team defeated the Cornhuskers 39–28 to finish the season 9–1–1. The outstanding player of the game was Steve Sloan. The 1965 Alabama football team was selected national champion by the AP Poll. The Coaches Poll selected Michigan State.
- 1973 – The 1973 Alabama Crimson Tide football team, coached by Bear Bryant, completed the regular season 11–0–0, winning the Southeastern Conference championship. Alabama was then invited to play Notre Dame in the December 31, 1973, Sugar Bowl. Coach Bryant's team lost to the Fighting Irish 24–23 to finish the season 11–1–0. The 1973 Alabama football team was selected national champion in the final regular-season Coaches Poll, which was finalized prior to the post-season bowl games. (The Coaches Poll began selecting their champion after the bowl games starting in 1974.) The post-bowl game AP Poll ranked Alabama fourth, and selected Notre Dame as its national champion.
- 1978 – The 1978 Alabama Crimson Tide football team, coached by Bear Bryant, completed the regular season 10–1–0, winning the Southeastern Conference championship. The Tide defeated No. 10–ranked Nebraska 20–3, and defeated No. 11–ranked Missouri 38–20, and lost to No. 7 ranked Southern California 24–14, during the regular season. The No. 2 ranked Alabama Crimson Tide was then invited to play the No. 1–ranked Penn State in the January 1, 1979 Sugar Bowl. Coach Bryant's team defeated the Nittany Lions 14–7 to finish the season 11–1–0. The outstanding player of the game was linebacker Barry Krauss. Alabama was selected national champion by the AP Poll, and Southern California was selected national champion by the Coaches Poll.
- 1979 – The 1979 Alabama Crimson Tide football team, coached by Bear Bryant, completed the regular season 11–0–0, winning the Southeastern Conference championship. The Tide defeated No. 18–ranked Tennessee 27–17, and defeated No. 14–ranked Auburn 25–18 during the regular season. Alabama was then invited to play No. 6–ranked Arkansas in the January 1, 1980 Sugar Bowl. Coach Bryant's team defeated the Razorbacks 24–9 to finish the season 12–0–0. The outstanding player of the game was running back Major Ogilvie. The 1979 Alabama football team was selected national champion by the AP Poll and the Coaches Poll.
- 1992 – The 1992 Alabama Crimson Tide football team, coached by Gene Stallings, completed the regular season 11–0–0. They then defeated No. 12–ranked Florida in the inaugural SEC Championship Game, defeating the Gators 28–21; the win gave Alabama its 20th SEC title and a record of 12–0–0. Alabama was then invited to play No. 1–ranked Miami, led by Heisman Trophy winner Gino Torretta, in the Bowl Coalition National Championship Game, 1993 Sugar Bowl. Coach Stallings' team defeated the Hurricanes 34–13 to finish the season 13–0–0. The outstanding player of the game was Derrick Lassic. The 1992 Alabama football team was awarded the national championship by the AP Poll and the Coaches Poll.

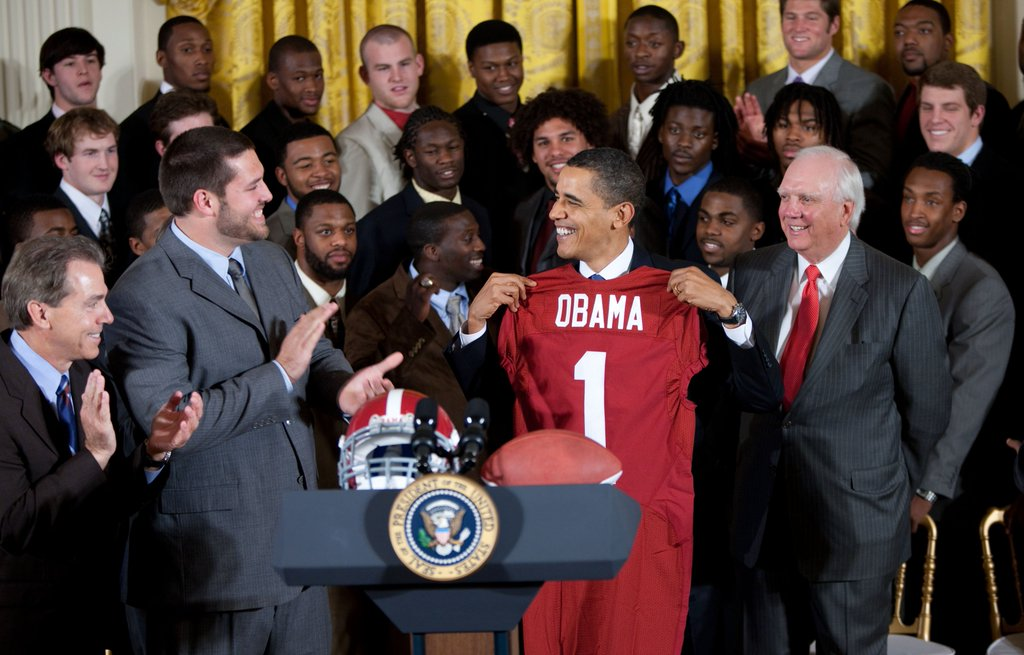
The Crimson Tide meeting with President Barack Obama after winning the 2009 national championship

- 2009 – The 2009 Alabama Crimson Tide football team, coached by Nick Saban, finished with a 12–0 regular season. In the twelve wins, the Crimson Tide defeated four teams that were ranked at the time, including an opening day victory over No. 7 Virginia Tech in the Chick-fil-A Kickoff Game. The team headed back to the Georgia Dome in December to face off against No. 1 Florida in the SEC Championship Game. The Crimson Tide defeated the Gators 32–13 in a rematch of the previous year's championship. Alabama then traveled to Pasadena to face No. 2 ranked Texas in the 2010 BCS National Championship Game at the Rose Bowl. Alabama's Heisman Trophy-winning running back, Mark Ingram II, rushed for 116 yards and two touchdowns in a 37–21 win. This was Alabama's first victory over Texas (1–7–1). Ingram was named the game's offensive MVP in Alabama's first BCS victory. The 2009 Alabama football team was selected national champion by the AP and Coaches Polls. The 2009 squad became the first FBS division team to defeat six teams ranked in the AP top 25 during one season and received a record six first-team AP All-America selections. The 2009 team finished with a perfect 14–0 record, an all-time highest number of wins in a season for Alabama.
- 2011 – The 2011 Alabama Crimson Tide football team, coached by Nick Saban, completed the regular season 11–1. The only loss of the season was to LSU in overtime 9–6. The team did not play in the SEC Championship Game because of that loss, but won convincingly in its final three regular-season games and earned a No. 2 ranking in the BCS poll. For their final regular season game, Alabama defeated rival Auburn 42–14. Alabama, led by Heisman trophy finalist Trent Richardson, then qualified to play No. 1 ranked LSU in the 2012 BCS National Championship Game. Coach Saban's team defeated the Tigers 21–0 and finished the season 12–1. Jeremy Shelley had a bowl record-tying five field goals in the game, and the game's offensive MVP was A. J. McCarron, and the defensive MVP was Courtney Upshaw. With the win, Alabama became the first team to shutout its opponent in a BCS bowl game. In addition to winning the BCS National Championship, the AP also awarded its national title to Alabama for the eighth time.
- 2012 – The 2012 Alabama Crimson Tide football team, coached by Nick Saban, completed the regular season 11–1. The only loss of the season was against Texas A&M 29–24. Despite the loss, Alabama won the SEC Western division and went to the 2012 SEC Championship Game, where they defeated Georgia 32–28 for the 23rd conference championship in school history. Alabama earned a No. 2 ranking in the final BCS rankings for the second straight year and as a result qualified for the 2013 BCS National Championship Game against No. 1 Notre Dame. Alabama defeated the Fighting Irish 42–14, finished the season 13–1, and the game's offensive MVP was Eddie Lacy, and the defensive MVP was C. J. Mosley. Alabama became the third team in history to win three national championships in a four-year period. This was Alabama's ninth AP national championship and tenth wire-service championship.
- 2015 – The 2015 Alabama Crimson Tide football team, coached by Nick Saban, finished the regular season 11–1. Their only loss was to Ole Miss 43–37. They won the SEC Western Division title with a record of 7–1, defeating rivals LSU and Tennessee en route, and then defeated Florida 29–15 in the SEC Championship. Alabama returned to the playoffs for the second consecutive season. After falling short in the semifinals against Ohio State in 2014, Alabama defeated the Michigan State Spartans 38–0 in the Cotton Bowl to advance to the Championship Game. Alabama beat the Clemson Tigers 45–40 and won the 2015 FBS national championship. Alabama's Heisman Trophy-winning running back Derrick Henry rushed for 158 yards and three touchdowns. This victory gave Coach Nick Saban his fifth national title, including four in the last seven seasons.
- 2017 – The 2017 Alabama Crimson Tide football team, coached by Nick Saban, finished the regular season 11–1. Their only loss was at Auburn 26–14. They won a share of the SEC Western Division title with a record of 7–1. Alabama returned to the playoffs for the fourth consecutive season. Alabama avenged the previous season's only loss in the National Championship game to Clemson with a 24–6 win in the Sugar Bowl. The Tide advanced to the Championship game for the third year in a row. Alabama defeated SEC opponent Georgia 26–23 in overtime. The victory gave Nick Saban his sixth national title, tying him with Paul W. Bryant for most all-time. It is also Alabama's fifth title in the last nine seasons.
- 2020 – The 2020 Alabama Crimson Tide football team, coached by Nick Saban, finished the regular season 10–0. The season was shortened to an all-conference schedule due to the COVID-19 pandemic. The Tide won the SEC Western Division title and defeated Florida 52–46 in the SEC Championship. Alabama returned to the playoffs for the sixth time in seven seasons. They defeated Notre Dame 31–14 in the Rose Bowl. The Tide advanced to the Championship game where they beat Ohio State 52–24. Alabama's Heisman Trophy-winning wide receiver DeVonta Smith had 215 yards and 3 touchdowns. The victory gave Saban his seventh national title, passing Bear Bryant for most all-time. It is also Alabama's sixth title in twelve years.

=== Conference championships ===
Alabama has been a member of the Southeastern Conference since its founding in 1932.

Alabama has won a total of 34 conference championships; this includes four Southern Conference and 30 SEC Championships. Alabama captured its four Southern Conference titles in 1924, 1925, 1926, and 1930. Alabama captured the first SEC title in 1933 and has won a total of 30 SEC Championships (1933, 1934, 1937, 1945, 1953, 1961, 1964, 1965, 1966, 1971, 1972, 1973, 1974, 1975, 1977, 1978, 1979, 1981, 1989†, 1992, 1999, 2009, 2012, 2014, 2015, 2016, 2018, 2020, 2021, 2023). The school has won more SEC football titles than any other school, including 11 since the conference split into separate divisions and added the Championship Game in 1992. Alabama is the only school to win an SEC Championship in every decade since the conference was founded in 1933.

Season	Conference	Coach	Overall record	Conference record
1924	Southern	Wallace Wade	8–1	5–0
1925	Southern	Wallace Wade	10–0	7–0
1926	Southern	Wallace Wade	9–0–1	8–0
1930†	Southern	Wallace Wade	10–0	8–0
1933	SEC	Frank Thomas	7–1–1	5–0–1
1934†	SEC	Frank Thomas	10–0	7–0
1937	SEC	Frank Thomas	9–1	6–0
1945	SEC	Frank Thomas	10–0	6–0
1953	SEC	Harold Drew	6–3–3	4–0–3
1961†	SEC	Paul "Bear" Bryant	11–0	7–0
1964	SEC	Paul "Bear" Bryant	10–1	8–0
1965	SEC	Paul "Bear" Bryant	9–1–1	6–1–1
1966†	SEC	Paul "Bear" Bryant	11–0	6–0
1971	SEC	Paul "Bear" Bryant	11–1	7–0
1972	SEC	Paul "Bear" Bryant	10–2	7–1
1973	SEC	Paul "Bear" Bryant	11–1	8–0
1974	SEC	Paul "Bear" Bryant	11–1	6–0
1975	SEC	Paul "Bear" Bryant	11–1	6–0
1977	SEC	Paul "Bear" Bryant	11–1	7–0
1978	SEC	Paul "Bear" Bryant	11–1	6–0
1979	SEC	Paul "Bear" Bryant	12–0	6–0
1981†	SEC	Paul "Bear" Bryant	9–2–1	7–0
1989†	SEC	Bill Curry	10–2	6–1
1992	SEC	Gene Stallings	13–0	8–0
1999	SEC	Mike DuBose	10–3	7–1
2009	SEC	Nick Saban	14–0	8–0
2012	SEC	Nick Saban	13–1	7–1
2014	SEC	Nick Saban	12–2	7–1
2015	SEC	Nick Saban	14–1	7–1
2016	SEC	Nick Saban	14–1	8–0
2018	SEC	Nick Saban	14–1	8–0
2020	SEC	Nick Saban	13–0	10–0
2021	SEC	Nick Saban	13–2	7–1
2023	SEC	Nick Saban	12–2	8–0

† Co-champions

=== Division championships ===
The SEC was split into two divisions beginning in the 1992 season. Alabama competed in the SEC West. Alabama won 18 division titles and posted an 11–4 record in the SEC Championship Game.

Season	Division	Opponent	SEC CG result
1992	SEC West	Florida	W 28–21
1993	SEC West	Florida	L 13–28
1994	SEC West	Florida	L 23–24
1996†	SEC West	Florida	L 30–45
1999	SEC West	Florida	W 34–7
2008	SEC West	Florida	L 20–31
2009	SEC West	Florida	W 32–13
2012	SEC West	Georgia	W 32–28
2013†	SEC West	N/A lost tiebreaker to Auburn	
2014	SEC West	Missouri	W 42–13
2015	SEC West	Florida	W 29–15
2016	SEC West	Florida	W 54–16
2017†	SEC West	N/A lost tiebreaker to Auburn	
2018	SEC West	Georgia	W 35–28
2020	SEC West	Florida	W 52–46
2021	SEC West	Georgia	W 41–24
2022†	SEC West	N/A lost tiebreaker to LSU	
2023	SEC West	Georgia	W 27–24

† Co-champions

== Individual accomplishments ==
=== First team All-Americans ===
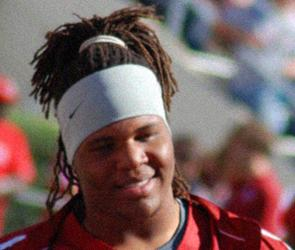
Terrence Cody was named an All-American for both 2008 and 2009 seasons.

Every year, several publications release lists of their ideal "team". The athletes on these lists are referred to as All-Americans. The NCAA recognizes five All-American lists. They are the Associated Press (AP), American Football Coaches Association (AFCA), Football Writers Association of America (FWAA), Sporting News (TSN), and the Walter Camp Football Foundation (WCFF). Alabama has had 150 players honored 174 times as first team All-Americans (85 consensus) in its history, including 20 players honored twice and two players (Cornelius Bennett and Woodrow Lowe) who were honored three times as a First Team All-American.

The most recent All-American from Alabama came after the 2025 season, when Kadyn Proctor, was named Consensus first-team All-American by various selectors.

=== College Football Hall of Fame inductees ===
In 1951, the College Football Hall of Fame opened in South Bend, Indiana. Since then, Alabama has had 23 players and 5 former coaches inducted into the Hall of Fame. Alabama had two members inducted into the inaugural 1951 class—Don Hutson and Frank Thomas.

Name	Time at Alabama	Position	Inducted
Mark Ingram II	2008–2010	RB	2026
Nick Saban	2007-2023	Head Coach	2025
Antonio Langham	1990–1993	CB	2024
Sylvester Croom	1972–1974	C	2022
E.J. Junior	1977–1980	OLB/ILB	2020
Derrick Thomas	1985–1988	OLB	2014
Marty Lyons	1975–1978	DT	2011
Gene Stallings	1990–1996	Head Coach	2010
Woodrow Lowe	1972–1975	ILB	2009
Cornelius Bennett	1983–1986	OLB/ILB	2005
Billy Neighbors	1959–1961	OT	2003
Johnny Musso	1969–1971	HB	2000
John Hannah	1970–1972	OG	1999
Ozzie Newsome	1974–1977	TE	1994
Harry Gilmer	1944–1947	QB/DB	1993
Vaughn Mancha	1944–1947	C	1990
Paul "Bear" Bryant	1958–1982	Head Coach	1986
Riley Smith	1934–1935	QB	1985
Lee Roy Jordan	1960–1962	ILB	1983
Johnny Cain	1930–1932	HB/FB	1973
Dixie Howell	1932–1934	HB	1970
Pooley Hubert	1922–1925	QB	1964
Johnny Mack Brown	1923–1925	HB	1957
Don Whitmire	1941–1942	OT	1956
Wallace Wade	1923–1930	Head Coach	1955
Fred Sington	1928–1930	OT	1955
Frank Thomas	1931–1946	Head Coach	1951
Don Hutson	1932–1934	End	1951

=== Award winners ===
==== Overall ====
- Heisman Trophy
  Mark Ingram II (2009)
  Derrick Henry (2015)
  DeVonta Smith (2020)
  Bryce Young (2021)
- Maxwell Award
  A. J. McCarron (2013)
  Derrick Henry (2015)
  Tua Tagovailoa (2018)
  DeVonta Smith (2020)
  Bryce Young (2021)
- Walter Camp Award
  Derrick Henry (2015)
  Tua Tagovailoa (2018)
  DeVonta Smith (2020)
- AP Player of the Year
  DeVonta Smith (2020)
  Bryce Young (2021)
- Sporting News Player of the Year
  Mark Ingram (2009)
  Tua Tagovailoa (2018)
  DeVonta Smith (2020)
  Bryce Young (2021)
- Lombardi Award
  Cornelius Bennett (1986)
  Jonathan Allen (2016)
  Will Anderson Jr. (2022)
- Chuck Bednarik Award
  Jonathan Allen (2016)
  Minkah Fitzpatrick (2017)
  Will Anderson Jr. (2022)
- Bronko Nagurski Trophy
  Jonathan Allen (2016)
  Will Anderson Jr. (2021, 2022)
- Paul Hornung Award
  DeVonta Smith (2020)
- Shaun Alexander Freshman of the Year Award
  Will Anderson Jr. (2020)
  Caleb Downs (2023)

==== Positional ====
- Davey O'Brien Award
  Mac Jones (2020)
  Bryce Young (2021)
- Doak Walker Award
  Trent Richardson (2011)
  Derrick Henry (2015)
  Najee Harris (2020)
- Fred Biletnikoff Award
  Amari Cooper (2014)
  Jerry Jeudy (2018)
  DeVonta Smith (2020)
- Butkus Award
  Derrick Thomas (1988)
  Rolando McClain (2009)
  C. J. Mosley (2013)
  Reuben Foster (2016)
- Johnny Unitas Golden Arm Award
  Jay Barker (1994)
  A. J. McCarron (2013)
  Mac Jones (2020)
- Jim Thorpe Award
  Antonio Langham (1993)
  Minkah Fitzpatrick (2017)
- Outland Trophy
  Chris Samuels (1999)
  Andre Smith (2008)
  Barrett Jones (2011)
  Cam Robinson (2016)
  Quinnen Williams (2018)
  Alex Leatherwood (2020)
- Rimington Trophy
  Barrett Jones (2012)
  Ryan Kelly (2015)
  Landon Dickerson (2020)
- Ted Hendricks Award
  Jonathan Allen (2016)
- Manning Award
  Mac Jones (2020)
  Bryce Young (2021)
- Joe Moore Award
  Offensive Line (2015, 2020)
- Patrick Mannelly Award
  Thomas Fletcher (2020)

==== Other ====
- Lott Trophy
  DeMeco Ryans (2005)
  Will Anderson Jr. (2022)
- Wuerffel Trophy
  Barrett Jones (2011)
- William V. Campbell Trophy
  Barrett Jones (2012)
  Jalen Milroe (2024)
- Sammy Baugh Trophy
  Steve Sloan (1965)
- Paul Warfield Trophy
  David Palmer (1993)
  Amari Cooper (2014)
- Jim Parker Trophy
  Andre Smith (2008)
  Barrett Jones (2011)
  Jonah Williams (2018)
- Jack Lambert Trophy
  Rolando McClain (2009)
- Jack Tatum Trophy
  Antonio Langham (1993)
- Bill Willis Trophy
  Quinnen Williams (2018)
- Kellen Moore Award
  A. J. McCarron (2013)
- Jon Cornish Trophy
  John Metchie III (2020, 2021)

==== Coaching ====
- Paul "Bear" Bryant Award
  Gene Stallings (1992)
  Nick Saban (2020)
- AFCA Coach of the Year
  Paul "Bear" Bryant (1961, 1971, 1973)
  Gene Stallings (1992)
- Eddie Robinson Coach of the Year
  Gene Stallings (1992)
  Nick Saban (2008)
- Walter Camp Coach of the Year
  Gene Stallings (1992)
  Nick Saban (2008, 2018)
- George Munger Award
  Gene Stallings (1992)
  Nick Saban (2016)
- Bobby Dodd Coach of the Year
  Bill Curry (1989)
  Nick Saban (2014)
- AP Coach of the Year
  Nick Saban (2008)
- Sporting News Coach of the Year
  Nick Saban (2008)
- Home Depot Coach of the Year
  Nick Saban (2008)
- Liberty Mutual Coach of the Year Award
  Nick Saban (2008)
- Bobby Bowden Coach of the Year
  Nick Saban (2009, 2011, 2012)
- Broyles Award
  Kirby Smart (2009)
  Mike Locksley (2018)
  Steve Sarkisian (2020)
- AFCA Assistant Coach of the Year
  Kirby Smart (2012)

=== Heisman Trophy ===
On December 12, 2009, Mark Ingram II became Alabama's first Heisman Trophy winner. In the closest race ever, he edged out Stanford running back Toby Gerhart by 28 points. Other notable finishes for an Alabama player occurred in 1993, when David Palmer finished third in the Heisman voting and when A. J. McCarron finished as runner-up for the 2013 season. Derrick Henry became Alabama's second Heisman trophy winner on December 12, 2015. Tua Tagovailoa finished runner-up for the 2018 season as well. For the 2020 season, Alabama became the second program in college football history to have three players finish in the top five. DeVonta Smith became Alabama's third Heisman winner with Mac Jones finishing third and Najee Harris fifth. In 2021, Bryce Young became the fourth winner with Will Anderson Jr. finishing fifth. With its fourth Heisman winner Alabama has produced the fifth most Heisman trophies of all time behind Notre Dame, Oklahoma, Ohio State and USC.

Top 5 finishes for Alabama players:

Year	Name	Position	Finish
1937	Joe Kilgrow	RB	5th
1945	Harry Gilmer	RB	5th
1947	Harry Gilmer	RB	5th
1961	Pat Trammell	QB	5th
1962	Lee Roy Jordan	LB	4th
1971	Johnny Musso	RB	5th
1972	Terry Davis	QB	5th
1993	David Palmer	WR	3rd
1994	Jay Barker	QB	5th
2009	Mark Ingram II	RB	1st
2011	Trent Richardson	RB	3rd
2013	A. J. McCarron	QB	2nd
2014	Amari Cooper	WR	3rd
2015	Derrick Henry	RB	1st
2018	Tua Tagovailoa	QB	2nd
2020	DeVonta Smith	WR	1st
2020	Mac Jones	QB	3rd
2020	Najee Harris	RB	5th
2021	Bryce Young	QB	1st
2021	Will Anderson Jr.	LB	5th

=== SEC Legends ===
Starting in 1994, the Southeastern Conference has annually honored one former football player from each of the SEC member schools as an "SEC Legend". The following former Crimson Tide football players have been honored as SEC Legends.

- 1994 Lee Roy Jordan
- 1995 Harry Gilmer
- 1996 Billy Neighbors
- 1997 John Hannah
- 1998 Holt Rast
- 1999 Johnny Musso
- 2000 Dwight Stephenson
- 2001 Joe Namath
- 2002 Vaughn Mancha
- 2003 Jeremiah Castille
- 2004 Bob Baumhower
- 2005 Cornelius Bennett
- 2006 Steve Sloan
- 2007 Ken Stabler
- 2008 Bart Starr
- 2009 Antonio Langham
- 2010 Cornelius Griffin
- 2011 Dennis Homan
- 2012 Paul Crane
- 2013 Marty Lyons
- 2014 Bobby Humphrey
- 2015 Woodrow Lowe
- 2016 Chris Samuels
- 2017 Gene Stallings
- 2018 Shaun Alexander
- 2019 Ray Perkins
- 2021 No new inductees due to COVID
- 2022 Ozzie Newsome
- 2023 Andre Smith
- 2024 Barrett Jones
- 2025 C. J. Mosley

== Rivalries ==
=== Auburn ===
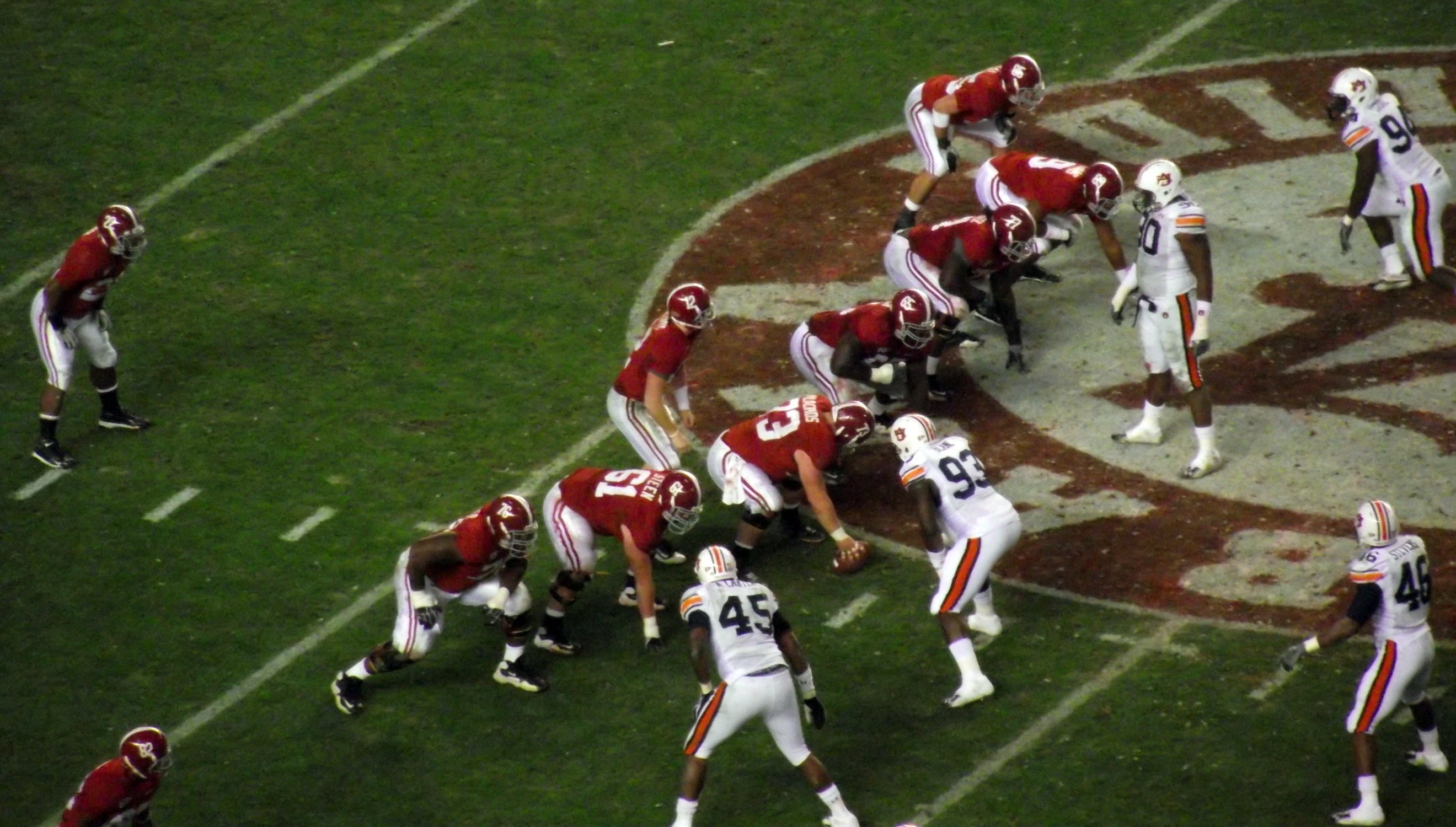
Alabama on offense against the Tigers in 2010

The main rivalry of the Crimson Tide is against its in-state rival, Auburn University; considered one of the top sporting rivalries in the US. The Alabama–Auburn game has come to be known as the Iron Bowl. The outcome of the game generally determines "bragging rights" in the state of Alabama until the following contest. The game may also have implications as to which team will represent the SEC Western Division in the SEC Championship Game.

On February 22, 1893, at Lakeview Park in Birmingham, Auburn was victorious in the first ever Iron Bowl, 32–22. The series was suspended after the 1907 contest, due to violence and financial complications. In 1944, Auburn suggested to reopen the series, though the board of trustees at Alabama rejected. The series was resumed in 1948, with Alabama crushing the Tigers 55–0, which is still the largest margin of victory in the series. In the following contest, Auburn shocked Alabama with a 14–13 victory, which is credited with helping revive the series.

For many years, the contest was held at Legion Field in Birmingham, before the teams began alternating between Bryant–Denny Stadium, in Tuscaloosa, and Jordan–Hare Stadium, in Auburn. Alabama won the most recent meeting 27–20 in Auburn and leads the series at 52–37–1.

=== Tennessee ===
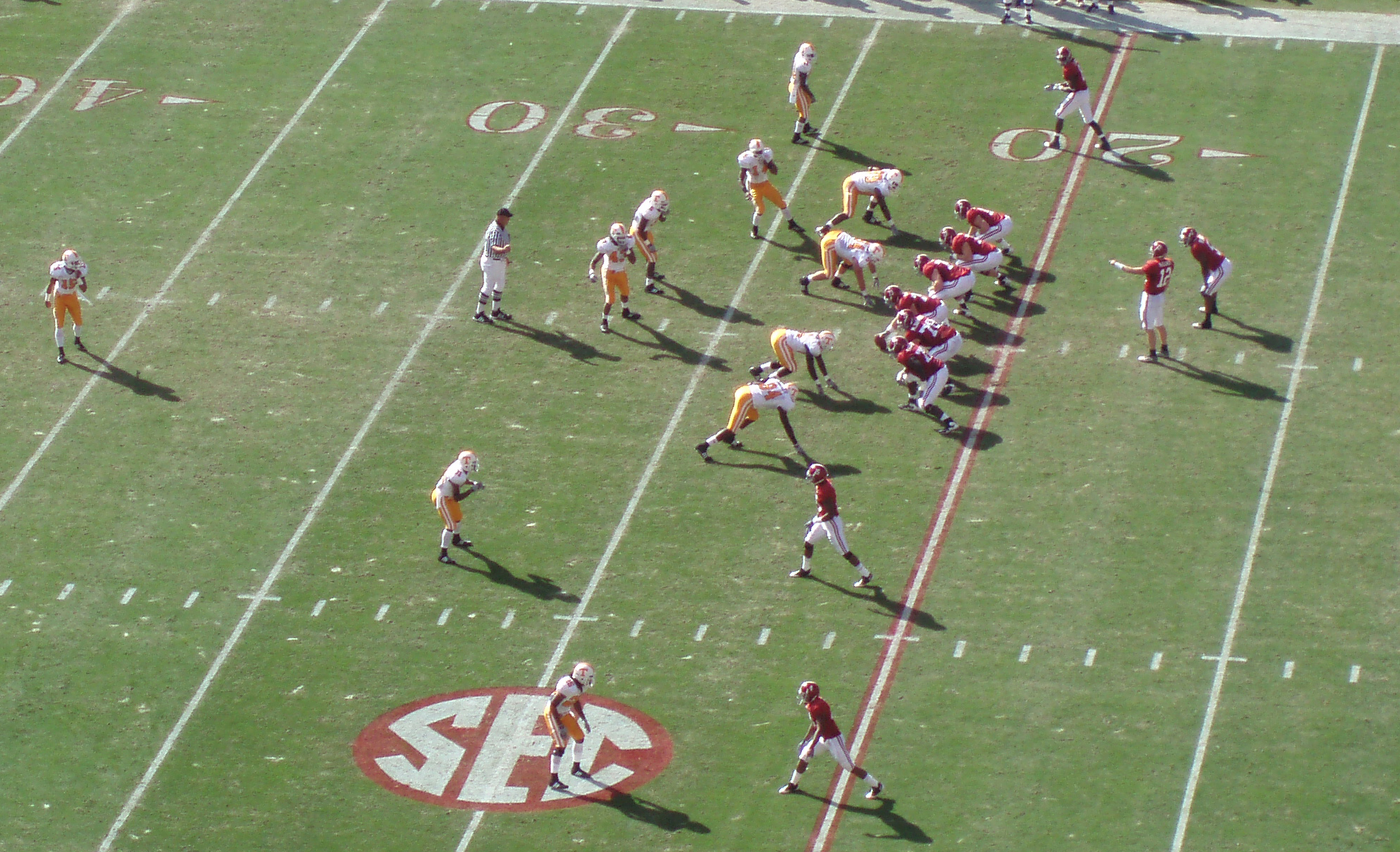
Alabama on offense versus Tennessee in Tuscaloosa during the 2009 season

Despite the heated in-state rivalry with Auburn, Bear Bryant was more adamant about defeating his rivals to the north, the Tennessee Volunteers. The series is named the Third Saturday in October, the traditional calendar date on which the game was played. Despite the name, the game has been played on the third Saturday only five times between 1995 and 2007. The first game between the two sides was played in 1901 in Birmingham, ending in a 6–6 tie. From 1902 to 1913, Alabama dominated the series, losing only once, and never allowing a touchdown by the Volunteers. Beginning in 1928, the rivalry was first played on its traditional date and began to be a challenge for the Crimson Tide as Robert Neyland began challenging Alabama for their perennial spot on top of the conference standings. In the 1950s, Jim Goostree, the head trainer for Alabama, began another tradition as he began handing out cigars following a victory over the Volunteers.

Between 1971 and 1981, Alabama held an 11-game winning streak over the Volunteers and, between 1986 and 1994, a nine-game unbeaten streak. However, following Alabama's streak, Tennessee responded with a seven-game winning streak from 1995 to 2001. Alabama holds the longest winning streak at 15 from 2007 to 2021. Tennessee won the most recent meeting 26-10 in Knoxville while Alabama leads the series 60–41-7.

=== LSU ===
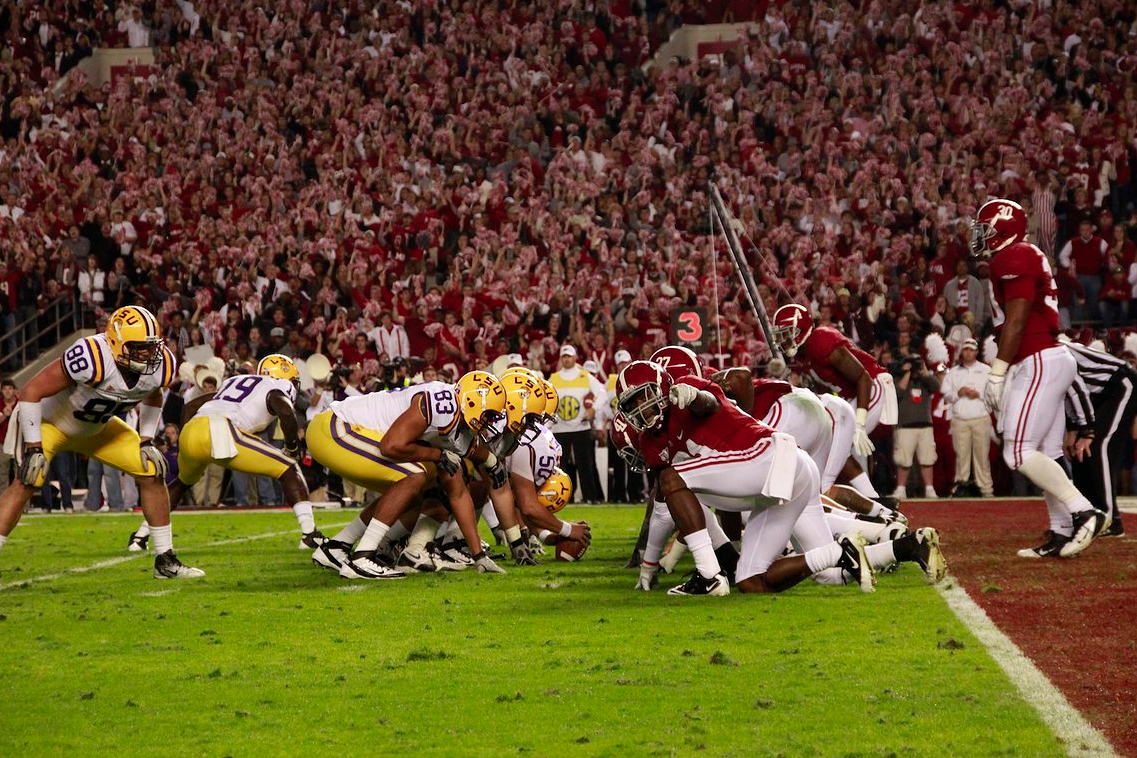
Alabama vs. LSU in 2011

A rivalry within the SEC Western Division occurs yearly between Alabama and the LSU Tigers. Starting in 1895, the Tigers were victorious 12–6 in the first meeting. The teams did not regularly meet until the mid-1960s during Alabama's dominance of the SEC. Between 1971 and 1981, the Crimson Tide won 11 consecutive times. In the 1969 game, LSU defeated Alabama 20–15 in Baton Rouge. Alabama did not lose again in Baton Rouge until 2000.

In 2007, the meeting was more heated following Alabama's hiring of head coach Nick Saban, who previously coached at LSU. With the hiring, many media outlets dubbed the 2007 meeting as the "Saban Bowl". The Crimson Tide lost the first "Saban Bowl" in 2007, won the 2008 and 2009 meetings only to lose in Baton Rouge in 2010.

In 2011, the teams played as the consensus No. 1 and No. 2 ranked teams in the polls with LSU winning 9–6 in overtime. They played each other again for the BCS National Championship with Alabama winning 21–0 to secure its 14th National Championship. Alabama won the most recent meeting 31-13 in Baton Rouge and leads the series 59-27–5.

=== Ole Miss ===
Alabama also maintains a rivalry with the Ole Miss Rebels. Alabama won the most recent meeting 24–10 in Tuscaloosa, and leads the series 55–10–2.

=== Mississippi State ===
Alabama's most-played rival is Mississippi State. The rivalry has been called the "Battle for Highway 82", with the schools being only 90 miles apart. Many cite the 2014 meeting as the biggest game in the series where Alabama faced a #1 ranked, 9–0 Mississippi State team with Dak Prescott as its quarterback. Alabama won 25–20, which helped catapult them into the first College Football Playoff. Alabama won the most recent meeting 56-23 in Starkville and leads the series 87-18–3.

=== Clemson ===
The series dates back to 1900 but the rivalry has intensified in recent years, with the last four meetings having national championship implications. Alabama leads the series 14–5.

=== Florida ===
Alabama has a rivalry with the Florida Gators, which was largely developed with the start of the SEC Championship Game. Alabama and Florida have met in 10 SEC Title Games (Alabama leads 6–4 in Title games), including the first 3 from 1992 to 1994. Alabama won the most recent meeting 31–29 in Gainesville, and leads the entire series 27–14.

=== Georgia ===
Alabama has a rivalry with the Georgia Bulldogs. Georgia won the most recent meeting 20-17 in Tuscaloosa while Alabama leads the series 45–28-4.

=== Former rivalries ===
The Georgia Tech Yellow Jackets were at one time considered Alabama's arch rival. During the suspension of the Iron Bowl between 1907 and 1948, Georgia Tech (then a member of the SEC) emerged as the most intense game on Alabama's schedule. The teams played many significant games, especially in the late 1950s and early 1960s. A heated feud developed between Bear Bryant and Georgia Tech head coach Bobby Dodd following a controversial hit in the 1961 game, a 10–0 Alabama victory. Dodd cited this feud as the primary impetus for Georgia Tech leaving the SEC three years later. The two teams have met 52 times, making Georgia Tech Alabama's most played among current non-conference opponents. Alabama leads the series 28–21–3; Georgia Tech won the last meeting in 1984. Alabama's fight song, "Yea Alabama", mentions Georgia Tech with the line "Send the Yellow Jackets to a watery grave."

There have been many historic games between Alabama and Penn State. The two teams met five times during the tenure of Bear Bryant, including in the 1979 Sugar Bowl, which determined the national championship for the 1978 season. The games usually have national implications—seven of the 15 meetings between the two schools have featured both teams ranked in the top ten—and eight of the meetings have been decided by a touchdown or less. The most recent game was in 2011, with Alabama winning 27–11. It was the final loss for long-time Penn State head coach Joe Paterno. Alabama leads the series 10–5.

== All-time record vs. current SEC teams ==
Official record (including any NCAA imposed vacates and forfeits) against all current SEC opponents as of the completion of the 2025 season.

Opponent	Won	Lost	Tied	Pct.	Streak	First meeting
Arkansas	27	7	0	.794	Won 17	1962
Auburn	52	37	1	.583	Won 6	1893
Florida	27	14	0	.659	Won 8	1916
Georgia	45	28	4	.610	Lost 2	1895
Kentucky	40	2	1	.942	Won 9	1917
LSU	59	27	5	.676	Won 4	1895
Mississippi State	87	18	3	.819	Won 17	1896
Missouri	7	2	0	.778	Won 7	1968
Oklahoma	3	5	1	.389	Won 1	1963
Ole Miss	55	9	2	.848	Won 8	1894
South Carolina	16	3	0	.842	Won 4	1937
Tennessee	60	41	7	.588	Lost 1	1901
Texas	2	8	1	.227	Lost 1	1902
Texas A&M	14	3	0	.824	Won 3	1942
Vanderbilt	65	19	4	.761	Won 2	1903
Totals	559	222	29	.708		

== Bowl games ==
This is a partial list of the ten most recent bowl seasons in which Alabama competed. Alabama has an overall bowl record of 46–30-3 (79 games) through the 2025 season.

Season	Bowl game	Opponent	Result
2016	Peach Bowl	Washington	W 24–7
2016	CFP National Championship	Clemson	L 31–35
2017	Sugar Bowl	Clemson	W 24–6
2017	CFP National Championship	Georgia	W 26–23 (OT)
2018	Orange Bowl	Oklahoma	W 45–34
2018	CFP National Championship	Clemson	L 16–44
2019	Citrus Bowl	Michigan	W 35–16
2020	Rose Bowl	Notre Dame	W 31–14
2020	CFP National Championship	Ohio State	W 52–24
2021	Cotton Bowl	Cincinnati	W 27–6
2021	CFP National Championship	Georgia	L 18–33
2022	Sugar Bowl	Kansas State	W 45–20
2023	Rose Bowl	Michigan	L 20–27 (OT)
2024	ReliaQuest Bowl	Michigan	L 13–19
2025	Rose Bowl	Indiana	L 3-38

== College Football Playoff ==
In 2024 the College Football Playoff expanded to include 12 teams in the field. The top four seeds receive a bye to the quarterfinals (New Years Six bowls) while the other eight play first round games with seeds 5 to 8 hosting the playoff games. First round games do not count as bowl games.

Season	Seed	Game	Opponent	Location	Result
2014	1st	Sugar Bowl (Playoff Semifinal)	No. 4 Ohio State*	Mercedes-Benz Superdome • New Orleans, LA	L 35-42
2015	2nd	Cotton Bowl (Playoff Semifinal)	No. 3 Michigan State	AT&T Stadium • Arlington, TX	W 38-0
2015	2nd	CFP National Championship	No. 1 Clemson	University of Phoenix Stadium • Glendale, AZ	W 45-40
2016	1st	Peach Bowl (Playoff Semifinal)	No. 4 Washington	Georgia Dome • Atlanta, GA	W 24-7
2016	1st	CFP National Championship	No. 2 Clemson*	Raymond James Stadium • Tampa, FL	L 31-35
2017	4th	Sugar Bowl (Playoff Semifinal)	No. 1 Clemson	Mercedes-Benz Superdome • New Orleans, LA	W 24-6
2017	4th	CFP National Championship	No. 3 Georgia	Mercedes-Benz Stadium • Atlanta, GA	W 26-23 (OT)
2018	1st	Orange Bowl (Playoff Semifinal)	No. 4 Oklahoma	Hard Rock Stadium • Miami Gardens, FL	W 45-34
2018	1st	CFP National Championship	No. 2 Clemson*	Levi's Stadium • Santa Clara, CA	L 16-44
2020	1st	Rose Bowl (Playoff Semifinal)	No. 4 Notre Dame	AT&T Stadium • Arlington, TX	W 31-14
2020	1st	CFP National Championship	No. 3 Ohio State	Hard Rock Stadium • Miami Gardens, FL	W 52-24
2021	1st	Cotton Bowl (Playoff Semifinal)	No. 4 Cincinnati	AT&T Stadium • Arlington, TX	W 27-6
2021	1st	CFP National Championship	No. 3 Georgia*	Lucas Oil Stadium • Indianapolis, IN	L 18-33
2023	4th	Rose Bowl (Playoff Semifinal)	No. 1 Michigan*	Rose Bowl • Pasadena, CA	L 20-27 (OT)
2025	9th	CFP First Round	No. 8 Oklahoma	Gaylord Family Oklahoma Memorial Stadium • Norman, OK	W 34-24
2025	9th	Rose Bowl (Playoff Quarterfinal)	No. 1 Indiana	Rose Bowl • Pasadena, CA	L 3-38

* The eventual national champion

== Alabama and the NFL ==
The University of Alabama has a combined 477 total players drafted from the National Football League (NFL), American Football League (AFL), and (NFL) supplemental draft. (Note: Because of the NFL–AFL merger agreement, the history of the AFL is officially recognized by the NFL and therefore this list includes the AFL draft (1960–1966) and the common draft (1967–1969).) Of these players 429 have been drafted into the National Football League (NFL) since the league began holding drafts in 1936. This includes 86 players taken in the first round and three overall number one picks, Harry Gilmer in the 1948 NFL draft, Joe Namath in the 1965 AFL draft and Bryce Young in the 2023 NFL draft. The University of Alabama has had 56 former players selected to a Pro Bowl, 164 Pro Bowl selections over all, 6 players honored as the leagues NFL Most Valuable Player, NFL Offensive Player of the Year, or NFL Defensive Player of the Year with 9 total selections (5 MVP, 3 Offensive Player of the Year, and 1 NFL Defensive Player of the Year), 52 former players selected 1st Team All-Pro, 53 former players have won a (NFL championship or Super Bowl) with their respective teams (70 times represented and won), and 8 players have been elected to the Pro Football Hall of Fame.

=== Pro Football Hall of Fame ===
Eight former Alabama football players have been inducted into the Pro Football Hall of Fame, the fourth most among all colleges.

Inducted	Player	Seasons	NFL team(s)	Years with NFL Team(s)
1963	Don Hutson	1932–1934	Green Bay Packers	1935–1945
1977	Bart Starr	1952–1955	Green Bay Packers	1956–1971
1985	Joe Namath	1962–1964	New York Jets	1965–1976
1985	Joe Namath	1962–1964	Los Angeles Rams	1977
1991	John Hannah	1970–1972	New England Patriots	1973–1985
1998	Dwight Stephenson	1977–1979	Miami Dolphins	1980–1987
1999	Ozzie Newsome	1974–1977	Cleveland Browns	1978–1990
2009	Derrick Thomas	1985–1988	Kansas City Chiefs	1989–1999
2016	Ken Stabler	1964–1967	Oakland Raiders	1970–1979
2016	Ken Stabler	1964–1967	Houston Oilers	1980–1981
2016	Ken Stabler	1964–1967	New Orleans Saints	1982–1984

=== Players in the National Football League ===
- Jonathan Allen, DT - Cincinnati Bengals
- Will Anderson Jr., LB - Houston Texans
- Terrion Arnold, S - Seattle Seahawks
- Christian Barmore, DT - New England Patriots
- Jordan Battle, S - Cincinnati Bengals
- Germie Bernard, WR - Pittsburgh Steelers
- Tyler Booker, OG - Dallas Cowboys
- Parker Brailsford, C - Cleveland Browns
- Brian Branch, S - Detroit Lions
- Chris Braswell, LB - Houston Texans
- Jihaad Campbell, LB - Philadelphia Eagles
- Josh Cuevas, TE - Baltimore Ravens
- Kam Dewberry, OG - Atlanta Falcons
- Landon Dickerson, C - Philadelphia Eagles
- Trevon Diggs, CB - Seattle Seahawks
- Justin Eboigbe, DE - Los Angeles Chargers
- Minkah Fitzpatrick, FS - New York Jets
- Jahmyr Gibbs, RB - Detroit Lions
- Da'Shawn Hand, DT - Atlanta Falcons
- Christian Harris, LB - Atlanta Falcons
- Ronnie Harrison, S - Miami Dolphins
- DeMarcco Hellams, S - Atlanta Falcons
- Derrick Henry, RB - Baltimore Ravens
- Marlon Humphrey, CB - Baltimore Ravens
- Domani Jackson, CB - Green Bay Packers
- Josh Jacobs, RB - Green Bay Packers
- Justin Jefferson, LB - Cleveland Browns
- Anfernee Jennings, LB - New Orleans Saints
- Jerry Jeudy, WR - Cleveland Browns
- Josh Jobe, CB - Seattle Seahawks
- Mac Jones, QB - San Francisco 49ers
- Tim Keenan III, DT - Las Vegas Raiders
- JC Latham, OT - Tennessee Titans
- Cameron Latu, TE - New England Patriots
- Phidarian Mathis, DL - Buffalo Bills
- Xavier McKinney, S - Green Bay Packers
- Kool-Aid McKinstry, CB - New Orleans Saints
- John Metchie III, WR - Carolina Panthers
- Jalen Milroe, QB - Seattle Seahawks
- Malachi Moore, S - New York Jets
- Robbie Ouzts, TE - Seattle Seahawks
- LT Overton, DT - Dallas Cowboys
- Daron Payne, DT - Washington Commanders
- Kadyn Proctor, OT - Miami Dolphins
- Jarran Reed, DT - Seattle Seahawks
- Will Reichard, K - Minnesota Vikings
- Calvin Ridley, WR - Tennessee Titans
- A'Shawn Robinson, DT - Tampa Bay Buccaneers
- Brian Robinson Jr., RB - Atlanta Falcons
- Que Robinson, LB - Denver Broncos
- J. K. Scott, P - Los Angeles Chargers
- Ty Simpson, QB - Los Angeles Rams
- DeVonta Smith, WR - Philadelphia Eagles
- Tim Smith, DT - Indianapolis Colts
- Tyler Steen, OT - Philadelphia Eagles
- Patrick Surtain II, CB - Denver Broncos
- Tua Tagovailoa, QB - Atlanta Falcons
- Henry To'oTo'o, LB - Houston Texans
- Dalvin Tomlinson, DT - Los Angeles Chargers
- Dallas Turner, LB - Minnesota Vikings
- Geno VanDeMark, C - Indianapolis Colts
- Jaylen Waddle, WR - Denver Broncos
- Jameson Williams, WR - Detroit Lions
- Quinnen Williams, DT - Dallas Cowboys
- Jedrick Wills, OT - Arizona Cardinals
- Mack Wilson, MLB - Arizona Cardinals
- Bryce Young, QB - Carolina Panthers
- Byron Young, DT - Philadelphia Eagles

== Media ==
During the football season, the Crimson Tide Sports Network (CTSN) broadcasts multiple shows on gameday for most sports. The network includes more than 60 radio stations across the country. Radio stations WFFN-FM, WTSK-AM as a backup, broadcast all home games in the Tuscaloosa area.

Football radio broadcasts begin three hours prior to the game's designated kickoff time with Chris Stewart and Tyler Watts in Around the SEC. The radio broadcast then moves to the Crimson Tide Tailgate Party hosted by Tom Roberts. Immediately following the end of the game, the Fifth Quarter Show begins as host Eli Gold talks to coaches and players and gives game statistics. For the 2008 season, former Alabama players and personalities were brought on to provide guest commentary for each broadcast.

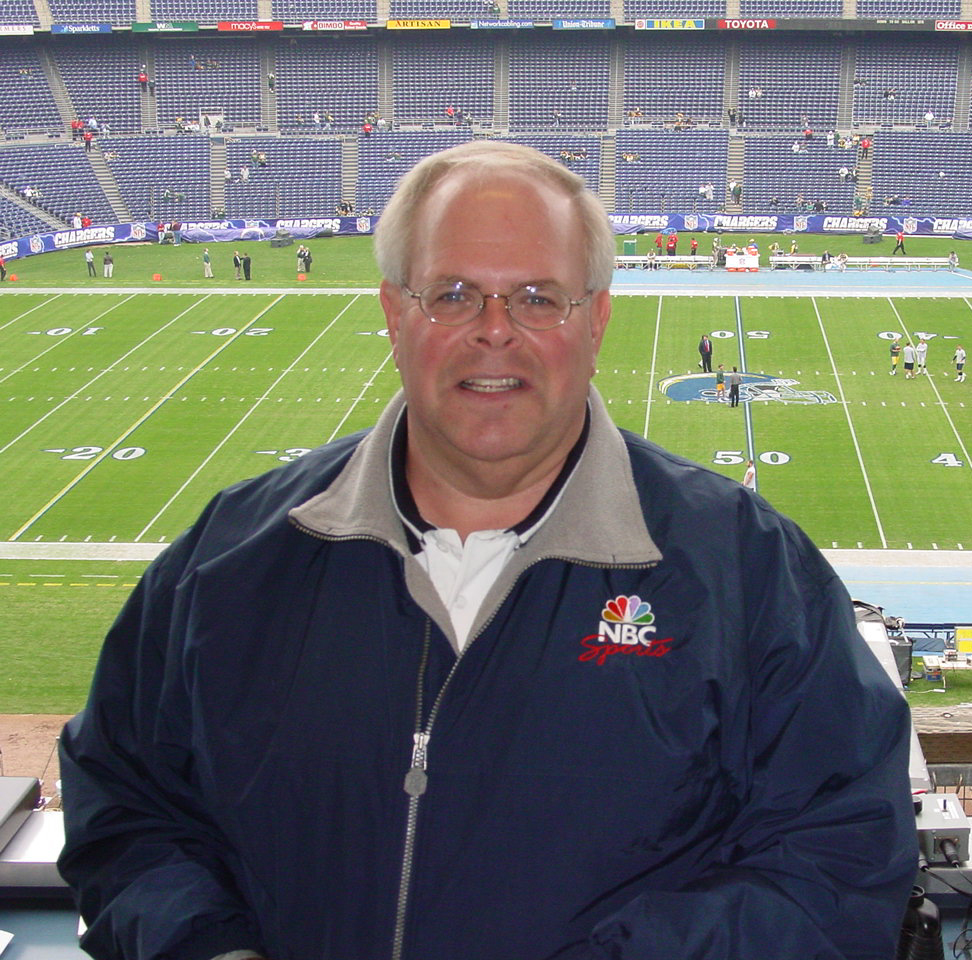
Eli Gold did play-by-play work for Alabama football from 1988 to 2023.

Current radio staff:

- Chris Stewart – play-by-play
- Tyler Watts – color analyst
- Cory Reamer – sideline reporter
- Chris Stewart, Tyler Watts – pre- and post-game show co-host
- Tom Roberts – director of broadcasting
- Tom Stipe, Butch Owens, Brian Roberts – producers

Former radio staff:

- Eli Gold, play-by-play
- Bert Bank, founder of the Alabama Football Network, producer emeritus
- John Forney, play-by-play
- Jerry Duncan, sideline reporter
- Paul Kennedy, play-by-play
- Doug Layton, color analyst
- Ken Stabler, color analyst
- John Parker Wilson, color analyst

== Future opponents ==
=== Conference opponents ===
From 1992 to 2023, Alabama played in the West Division of the SEC and played each opponent in the division each year along with several teams from the East Division. The SEC will expand the conference to 16 teams and will eliminate its two divisions in 2024, causing a new scheduling format for the Crimson Tide to play against the other members of the conference. Only the 2024 conference schedule was announced on June 14, 2023, while the conference still considers a new format for the future.

=== Non-conference opponents ===
Announced schedules as of October 5, 2026.

2027	2028	2029	2030	2031	2032	2033	2034	2035
Marshall	Georgia State	Louisiana Tech	at Georgia Tech	Georgia Tech	Arizona	at Arizona	at Virginia Tech	Virginia Tech
Mercer	Ohio State	at Notre Dame	Notre Dame	at Boston College	at Minnesota	Minnesota	Boston College	
at Ohio State	UT Martin	Gardner– Webb			South Florida			

== See also ==
- List of Alabama Crimson Tide home football stadiums
- University of Alabama traditions
