= Alabama Crimson Tide =

Intercollegiate sports teams

- University: University of Alabama
- Nickname: Crimson Tide
- NCAA: Division I (FBS)
- Conference: SEC
- Athletic director: Greg Byrne
- Location: Tuscaloosa, Alabama
- Varsity teams: 21
- Football stadium: Saban Field at Bryant–Denny Stadium
- Basketball arena: Coleman Coliseum
- Baseball stadium: Sewell–Thomas Stadium
- Softball stadium: Rhoads Stadium
- Soccer stadium: Alabama Soccer Stadium
- Aquatics center: Alabama Aquatic Center
- Rowing venue: Black Warrior River
- Tennis venue: Alabama Tennis Stadium
- Outdoor track and field venue: Bailey Track Stadium
- Volleyball arena: Foster Auditorium
- Athletics Foundation: Crimson Tide Foundation
- Other venues: Crimson Reserve; Pritchett Running Park
- Colors: Crimson and white
- Mascot: Big Al
- Fight song: Yea Alabama
- Cheer: "Roll Tide" (widely used); "Go Bama"
- Website: rolltide.com

SEC logo in Alabama's colors

The Alabama Crimson Tide refers to the intercollegiate athletic varsity teams that represent the University of Alabama, located in Tuscaloosa. The Crimson Tide teams compete in the National Collegiate Athletic Association's Division I as members of the Southeastern Conference (SEC). The Spirit Squads compete in the UCA and UDA College National Championships.

Athletics facilities on the campus include the 100,077-seat Bryant–Denny Stadium, named after football coach Paul "Bear" Bryant and former University President George Denny, 15,316-seat Coleman Coliseum, Foster Auditorium, Sewell–Thomas Stadium, the Alabama Soccer Stadium, the Sam Bailey Track Stadium, the Alabama Aquatic Center, and the Alabama Tennis Stadium.

== Sports sponsored ==
Men's sports	Women's sports
Baseball	Basketball
Basketball	Cross country
Cross country	Golf
Football	Gymnastics
Golf	Rowing
Swimming & diving	Soccer
Tennis	Softball
Track and field^{†}	Swimming & diving
	Tennis
	Track and field^{†}
	Volleyball
† – Track and field includes both indoor and outdoor.

=== Football ===
University of Alabama law student William G. Little learned how to play American football while attending school in Andover, Massachusetts and began teaching the sport to fellow Alabama students in early 1892. Later in the year, the school formed an official team of 19 players, with Little as captain and E. B. Beaumont as head coach. Early newspaper accounts of Alabama football simply listed the team as the "varsity" or the "Crimson White", after the school colors. Headline writers then made popular the nickname "The Thin Red Line". It was not until 1907 that the name "Crimson Tide" was used to describe Alabama. The name was supposedly first used by Hugh Roberts, former sports editor of the Birmingham Age-Herald. Roberts coined the nickname to describe the 1907 Alabama–Auburn game, played in a sea of mud. Although Auburn was favored to win, Alabama played well in the red mud and held Auburn to a 6–6 tie.

Since then, the program has won 28 Southeastern Conference (SEC) championships and claimed 18 national championships. These include, for years prior to consensus selections, five titles from NCAA-recognized "major selectors" bestowed in 1934 and 1941, and retrospectively for 1925, 1926, and 1930. Alabama was also retrospectively selected as national champion for 1945, 1966, and 1977, as well as at the end of the 1975 college football season by the Matthews, Congrove, Colley Matrix, and Dunkel Systems, but these five are not claimed by the university. In January 2012, Alabama defeated No. 1 LSU 21–0 to take the BCS national title. In January 2013, Alabama defeated the Notre Dame Fighting Irish 42–14 for its 15th national championship. In January 2016, Alabama defeated the Clemson Tigers 45–40 to claim its 16th national championship. On January 8, 2018, Alabama defeated the Georgia Bulldogs 26–23 to take the team's 17th national championship. On January 11, 2021, Alabama defeated the Ohio State Buckeyes 52-24 for its 18th national championship.

The team has also made 65 bowl appearances throughout its history (an NCAA record), beginning with the 1926 Rose Bowl. Alabama's most recent bowl appearance was a loss to the eventual National Champion, University of Michigan, 20-27 at the 2024 Rose Bowl. Alabama is scheduled to play Michigan again on December 31, 2024. Alabama has a 44–26–3 bowl game record. Since 1913, Alabama has had 98 players selected as first team All-Americans, with 29 of them being consensus selections. In 2009, Alabama also recorded their first Heisman Trophy winner, Mark Ingram II, in the closest Heisman Trophy race. In 2015, Alabama had its second Heisman Trophy winner in Derrick Henry. In 2020, wide receiver DeVonta Smith became the program's third Heisman Trophy winner. And in 2022 Bryce Young became the first quarterback, and fourth overall Heisman Trophy winner.

=== Men's basketball ===
Alabama's men's basketball program has numerous SEC Championships and players becoming NBA stars and international professional players. In the conference, it trails only Kentucky in basketball wins, SEC tournament titles, and SEC regular season conference titles. The men's basketball program rose to a No. 1 national ranking briefly in 2002. The Crimson Tide became a regular conference basketball contender much as it was in the 1980s under the direction of Coach Wimp Sanderson. Under head coach and former point guard Mark Gottfried, the Tide advanced to postseason play for six consecutive years, culminating with the team's advancement into the Elite Eight of the NCAA tournament for the first time in school history in 2004, where the team lost to eventual champion Connecticut in the Phoenix regional final.

In January 2009, Head Coach Mark Gottfried resigned after eleven years at Alabama. Soon afterwards Anthony Grant was hired as the new head coach. Under his watch the Crimson Tide battled through a tough first year, finishing 17–15 and achieving a top-10 ranking in points allowed on defense. Grant's second season with the Tide resulted in the SEC Western Division Championship, finishing 12–4 in the SEC and an overall record of 25–12. They entered the 2011 NIT Tournament with a No. 1 seed and made it to the NIT Championship Game and finished as the runner-up. The Crimson Tide was unbeaten at home with a perfect 19–0 season, a school record. In 2012 the Crimson Tide was a participant in the NCAA tournament and finished its season with a 21–12 record. Former Dallas Mavericks and New Jersey/Brooklyn Nets coach Avery Johnson became the Alabama Head Coach on April 5, 2015. Nate Oats became head coach on March 27, 2019. Since then Nate Oats has been 92-41 with the Tide. In 2023 they went all the way to the tournament as the no.1 seed for the first time in program history. They lost to the San Diego State in the Sweet Sixteen.

=== Women's basketball ===
Alabama's women's basketball team competes in Coleman Coliseum and had previously played in Foster Auditorium. The team played its first game in 1974 and has since been a varsity sport. The team has had nine head coaches, including Rick Moody, who guided the club to the 1994 NCAA Women's Final Four. Kristy Curry was named head coach on May 11, 2013, replacing Wendell Hudson.

The Crimson Tide has appeared in ten post-season Tournaments for the NCAA Women's Division I Basketball Championship, including an eight-year streak of consecutive appearances in the tournament stretching from 1992 to 1999. In ten NCAA tournament appearances, Alabama has advanced to the "Sweet Sixteen" six times and the "Elite Eight" and the "Final Four" in 1994. The most successful season was 1996–1997 when the Tide finished second in the Southeastern Conference (10–2 record) and had a mid-season national ranking of No. 2 in polls by the AP and USA Today (November 12, 1996); they finished with a 25–7 overall record. The University of Alabama Women's Basketball program shares the national record with Duke University for the most total points for both teams when Alabama defeated Duke 121–120 (in four overtimes) in 1995 in the NCAA tournament, a game that ESPN has declared as one of the best all-time women's basketball tournament games. Seven former players for the University of Alabama have made rosters of teams of the WNBA. Alabama has had an active player in the WNBA through every year of its existence. The current head coach for the Crimson Tide is Kristy Curry. The team played its first season of 1974–75 in Foster Auditorium, but moved to what is now Coleman Coliseum the following season. After Foster Auditorium was extensively renovated in a project that began in 2009, the Tide returned to their original home on February 13, 2011.

=== Baseball ===
Alabama has baseball. The Crimson Tide is second to LSU for the most SEC titles with 14 (including 13 regular season titles and one tournament title that was won in 1983, during an era in which the tournament decided the overall SEC title). Alabama is also second to the Tigers with seven SEC Tournament championships, including the 1983 one that decided the overall SEC title. Tide baseball teams have participated in the NCAA College World Series five times (1950, 1983, 1996, 1997, 1999), finishing second in 1983 (to Texas) and 1997 (to LSU). Home games are played at Sewell–Thomas Stadium, known as "The Joe" to Crimson Tide fans. The baseball team is currently coached by head coach Brad Bohannon.

=== Softball ===
The Alabama softball team was started in 1997. They are currently coached by head coach Patrick Murphy and assistant coaches Alyson Habetz and Stephanie VanBrakle. They have won six Southeastern Conference championships (two regular seasons and four tournaments), made 18 consecutive NCAA tournaments (every year since 1999) and have advanced to the Women's College World Series eight times, including back-to-back third-place finishes in the 2008 and 2009 series. On June 7, 2012, Alabama became the first team in SEC history to win the WCWS Championship defeating Oklahoma in three games. The team's current overall record stands at 708–224 (.759). Alabama has won the SEC softball tournament five times (1998, 2003, 2005, 2010 and 2012).

=== Golf ===
Alabama's men's and women's golf teams have become two of the top programs in the nation since head coaches Jay Seawell (men) and Mic Potter (women) took over in the 2002 and 2006 respectively. They have combined to make the NCAA tournament 13 out of 14 chances since they arrived, and have each led their teams to a Southeastern Conference Championship. Overall the Crimson Tide golf teams have combined to make the NCAA tournament 31 times, won the SEC Championship four times, and have had over 30 players honored as All-Americans. The men's golf program finished sixth in the nation in 2007, while being consistently ranked in the top three in the 2007–08 season. The home course for the Tide has been the Ol' Colony Golf Complex since 2005.

In 2012, the Crimson Tide has two of the best teams in the country with the women ranked No. 1 and men ranked No. 4 by Golf Week. The women's golf team won their first national title in 2012 while the men finished as the national runner-up. In 1941, Eleanor Dudley won the inaugural women's individual intercollegiate golf championship (an event conducted by the Division of Girls' and Women's Sports (DGWS)—which later evolved into the AIAW championship in the 1970s).

On June 2, 2013, the Alabama men's golf team won their first NCAA national title after defeating Illinois in the title match.

=== Gymnastics ===
The women's gymnastics squad at the University of Alabama first competed in 1975. The squad did not have a winning season until the arrival of former coach Sarah Patterson in 1979. In the following 35 years under Patterson and her husband David, the squad won six NCAA national championships, seven SEC championships, 26 regional titles, and 248 All-American honors. It has placed in the top five at the NCAA Championships 25 of the past 29 years and won national championships six times: in 1988, 1991, 1996, 2002, and most recently won back to back titles in 2011 and 2012. Alabama has also won nine SEC Championships including 1988, 1990, 1995, 2000, 2003, 2009, 2011, 2014, and 2015. The gymnastics squad also hosts an annual fundraiser for breast cancer, where the crowd is encouraged to "Think Pink" and support the cause by turning out in pink clothing. As of the 2009 fundraiser, the effort had raised in excess of $750,000.

UA gymnastics meets have an average attendance of over 13,000 at Coleman Coliseum. Meets against the team's arch-rival, the University of Georgia Gymdogs, often sell out. Alabama holds seven of the eleven NCAA records for the largest gymnastics crowds of all time, including an attendance of 15,162 fans on January 20, 2006. The Alabama's gymnastics team is led by Ashley Priess-Johnston, who was a gymnast herself at The University of Alabama from 2009-2013. She succeeded Dana Duckworth following the 2022 season, who served as the Tide head coach since 2015 after Sarah Patterson retired.

=== Track and field ===
The Crimson Tide's men's track and field program has produced numerous individual national champions, including Calvin Smith, the former world record holder in the 100-meter dash, Jan Johnson (pole vault), Gary England (shot put), Jeff Woodard (high jump), William Wuycke (1000 yards and 1000 meters), Emmit King (100 m), Keith Talley (55 m and 100 m hurdles), Andrew Owusu (long jump), Miguel Pate (long jump and NCAA national record), Mats Nilsson, Tim Broe (3000 m steeplechase), David Kimani (3000 m indoor and 5000 m), Kirani James (400 m), Diondre Batson (Indoor 200 meters), Hayden Reed (Discus) and the 4 × 100 meter relay team of Richard Beattie, Brad McQuaig, Eduardo Nava, and Clive Wright, and the mile relay team of Joe Coombs, Darroll Gatson, Tony Husbands, and Ike Levin.

Individual national champions from the Crimson Tide women's track and field team have included Disa Gisladottir (high jump), Iris Gronfeldt (javelin), Lillie Leatherwood (400 m), Pauline Davis-Thompson (200 m), Flora Hyacinth (triple jump), Beth Mallory (discus), Remona Burchell (indoor 60 m), and Quanesha Burks (long jump). Liz McColgan (née Lynch) initially won the mile run at the 1986 NCAA Division I Indoor Track and Field Championships, but she was retroactively declared ineligible months later after an investigation found she accepted prize money at road races, compromising her amateur status under rules at the time. The Crimson Tide track and field coach John Mitchell resigned in the wake of the findings.

Coach Dan Waters is the head coach for both the men's and women's track and field program, assuming the position in 2012. The university hosts the Alabama Relays and the Crimson Classic annually, which brings many of the top programs in the country to compete at the Sam Bailey Track Stadium, built in 1975 with seating for 4,500 fans. A renovation project in 2012 created a facility that is among America's best.

=== Women's soccer ===
Women's soccer was a varsity sport from 1986 to 1988, and was revived in 1994. Former head coach Don Staley had been with the program since 1994, but stepped down at the end of the 2007 season. He was replaced with former Clemson University head coach Todd Bramble. The team has won the SEC West three times (1995, 97, 98) and participated in the NCAA Women's Soccer Championship in 1999 and 2011. In 2005, senior Libby Probst earned third team All-American honors and the SEC Scholar-Athlete of the Year award after breaking almost every major offensive record in her career at the Capstone. The team currently plays its home games at the Alabama Soccer Stadium. Wes Hart became the head coach in 2015.

=== Women's volleyball ===
The Alabama women's volleyball is coached by Ed Allen, who was hired on January 10, 2011. The team has competed in the NCAA Women's Volleyball Championship in 2005, 2006, and 2007. The team won the SEC Western Division Championship in 2000 and 2004, and was the SEC Volleyball Tournament Runner-up in 2005. In 2000, the Alabama Volleyball team achieved the nation's best team-GPA among Division I Volleyball teams. Past coaches for Alabama Volleyball have included Stephanie Schleuder, Dorothy Franco-Reed, and Judy Green. The venue for the Crimson Tide's home volleyball games is Foster Auditorium.

=== Tennis ===
Men's and women's tennis at the University of Alabama have built a tradition of excellence and enjoy competing in the Roberta Alison Baumgardner Indoor Tennis Facility, and the University of Alabama Tennis Stadium, which has won an award from USTA for being among the most excellent tennis facilities in the nation, and has been selected as the host site for regional tournaments by the NCAA in 2012 and 2013. In the 1960s, Roberta Alison became Alabama's first female athlete when she joined the men's team and occasionally played the No. 1 and No. 2 positions. She went on to win American Women's collegiate Championships in 1962 and 1963 for singles, and 1963 in doubles. Today the Alabama Tennis program hosts the Roberta Alison Fall Tennis Classic each year to honor her.

Alabama men's tennis began in 1949 with the coach, Lee Shapiro. Through the years, additional coaches have developed Alabama's program, including C. de la Manardiere (1951–1953, 1956); Rafael de Valle (1954–1955 and 1958–1960); Dr. Eugene Lambert (coach) in 1957; Jason Morton (1961–1964); Earl Baumgardner (1965–1966); Bill Mallory in 1967; Dale Anderson (1968–1969); Bill McClain (1970–1977); Armistead Neely (1978–1982); Tommy Wade (1983–1988); John Kreis (1989–1994); Joey Rive (1995–1997); Adam Steinberg (1998–2002); Billy Pate (2003–2012), and the current head coach, George Husack, 2013.

The Men's Tennis Team has been a participant in the NCAA tournament 17 times: 1989, 1990, 1993, 1996, 1997, 1998, 1999, 2001, 2002, 2003, 2004, 2006, 2007, 2008, 2009, 2010, and 2013, as well as having 33 singles qualifying and 17 doubles qualifying for the NCAA tournament. Alabama's All-Americans include Jeff Robinson (1976, 1977), Andy Solis (1984, 1985), Gregg Hahn (1985, 1986), John Stimpson (1990), Francisco Rodriquez (1998, 1999), Maxim Belski (2001), Clinton Ferriera (1986, 1989), Ellis Ferriera (1989, 1990, 1991), Rick Witsken (1991, 1993), and Juan Carlos Bianchi (1993). Additionally, Stephen Mitchell, among others, played professionally, and Konstantinos Efraimoglou was an Olympian in tennis in 1992. Ellis Ferreira became the champion at the 2000 Australian Open in men's doubles and 2001 Australian Open in mixed doubles. Davis Cup participants have included Juan Carlos Bianchi, Francisco Rodriguez, and Michael-Ray Pallares-González.

Alabama's women's tennis team began in 1975, although Roberta Alison competed individually through the men's team years earlier. Coaches for the Crimson Tide Women's tennis team include Jean Mills (1975–1978), Mark Heinrick (1979–1980), Lewis Lay in 1981, Peter Heffeman (1982–1984), Karin Gaiser (1985–1993), Jim Tressler (1994–1997), Michelle Morton in 1997, and the current coach, Jenny Mainz (1998–2013). Coach Jenny Mainz was named in 2013 as the National Coach of the Year after her team reached the Round of 16 and had a singles player and a doubles team to both reach the national semifinals.

All-Americans for the Crimson Tide women's tennis team include Titia Wilmink (1993), Marouschka van Dijk (1993), Baili Camino (1997), Robin Stephenson (2005), Alexa Guarachi (2013), Mary Anne Macfarlane (2012, 2013). The Crimson Tide women's team has sent 17 qualifiers for NCAA Singles Tournaments and twelve for the Doubles Tournaments as of 2013. The Tide competed as a team in the NCAA tournaments of 1993, 1997, 2001, 2002, 2003, 2004, 2005, 2006, 2009, 2011, 2012, and 2013. The 2013 team produced the best results in program history, ending the season with a Sweet Sixteen appearance. Alabama was the winner of the NCAA Women's Doubles National Championship in 2014 and 2015 with the team of Erin Routliffe and Maya Jansen.

=== Women's rowing ===
Women's rowing is the most recent addition to Alabama's list of varsity athletics. Mal Moore announced the addition of Alabama's 21st varsity sport in October 2005. The women's rowing team became the newest varsity sport at Alabama in Fall 2006. The team was added due to Title IX considerations and allows for 20 full scholarships. Taking only girls who had previously rowed for the Alabama Crew Club (est. 1987) and other walk-ons, Head Coach Larry Davis built the program from the ground up. In the first year of competition (2006–2007), the Tide defeated the University of Cincinnati, Creighton University, and Murray State University and also won medals at the Head of the Chattahoochee and the Head of the South.

The second year (2007–2008) of competition surprised many as the Varsity eight went on to win silver medals at the prestigious Head of the Charles Regatta in Boston, and also the Southern Intercollegiate Rowing Association Championships in Oak Ridge, Tennessee. The Tide again medaled at the Chattanooga Head Race and the Head of the South and recorded several match race victories against Southern Methodist, Creighton, Murray State, Drake, and the North Carolina. The team also landed three boats in the top ten of their categories at the Dad Vail Regatta in Philadelphia.

Within two years, the team has had 25 athletes earn SEC Academic Honor Roll honors and 16 earn Collegiate Rowing Coaches Association Scholar-Athlete awards. For the 2007–2008 school year, Women's Rowing won the team service award by posting the most number of community service hours (over 1500) out of all women's sports at Alabama. Nationally, the Alabama women's rowing team has won both silver (in 2007) and bronze (in 2009) medals in the women's championship 8+ category at the Head of the Charles regatta in Boston.

Before the SEC added women's rowing in 2024–25, the Crimson Tide had housed that sport in the Big 12 Conference.

=== Others ===
Other varsity sports include swimming and diving, and cross-country. The university supports both men's and women's programs in all these sports. The school has had individual success in all these sports, including Vladislav Polyakov winning national titles in the 200-meter men's breaststroke in 2005 and 2007.

=== Spirit Squads ===
Cheerleaders cheering on the crowd, 2010

The Spirit Squads are made up of two cheerleading squads (Coed Squad and All-Girl Squad), the Alabama Dance Team, and Big Al. They appear at many University sporting events.

The cheer squads and dance team compete annually at the UCA/UDA College National Championships in Division 1A. The Coed Cheerleading squad won for the first time in 2011 and then again in 2015. They came in second in 2017, fourth in 2018, and third in 2019 in the D1A Coed Championship. The All-Girl Squad debuted in 2014 placing second in their debut UCA appearance. The All-Girl team came back to win in 2015 and had repeated wins in 2020 and 2022 in the D1A All-Girl Championship. In 2015 Alabama became the first school to clean sweep both Division 1A cheer titles. The Alabama Dance Team placed seventh in Hip Hop in 2018 and 2019, and 11th in 2019 in Jazz at the UDA College National Championship. 2019 was the first year in school history that the dance team finaled in both of their two divisions.

== Club sports ==
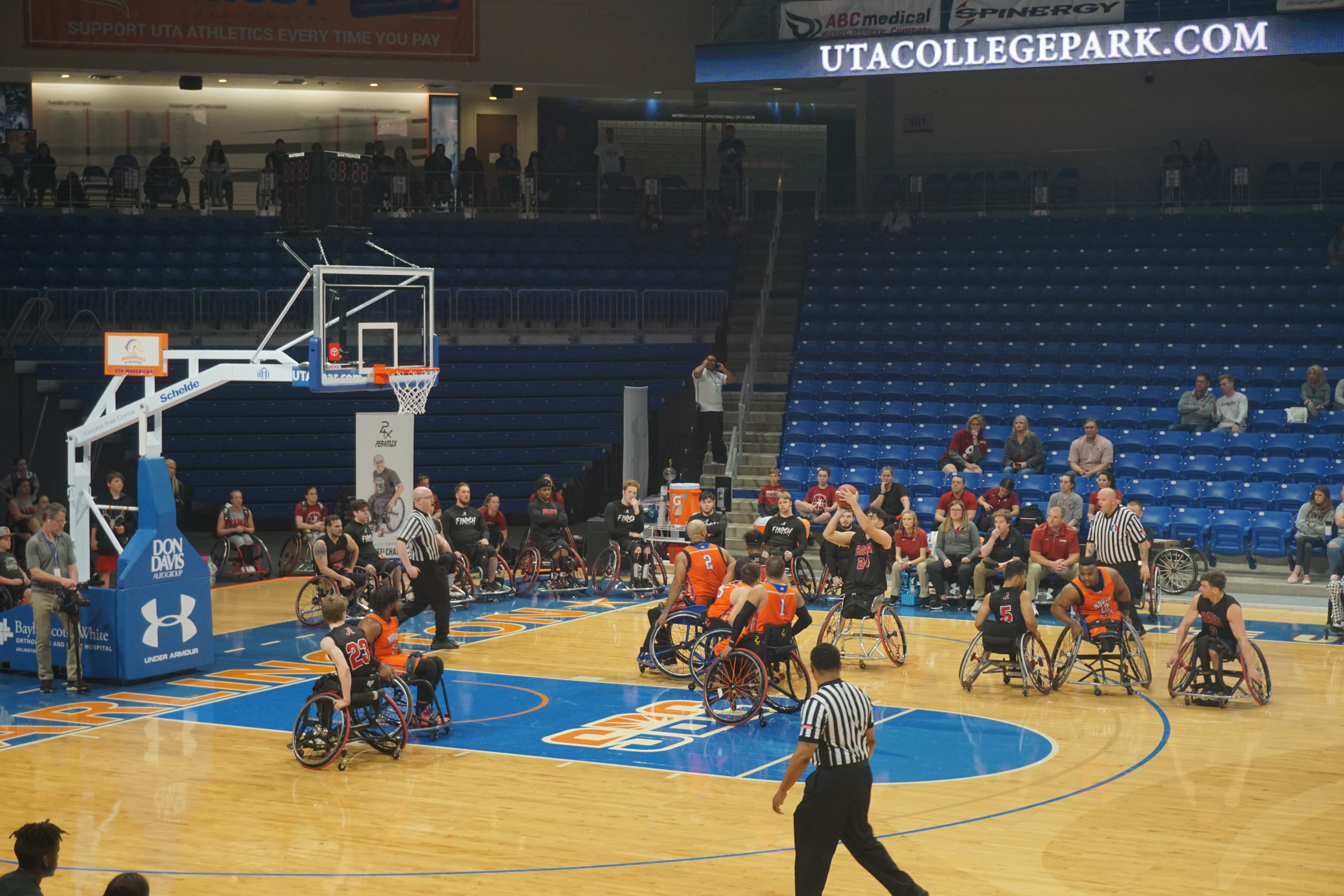
Men's wheelchair basketball playing against the UT Arlington Movin' Mavs in the 2022 National Intercollegiate Wheelchair Basketball Tournament Men's Championship

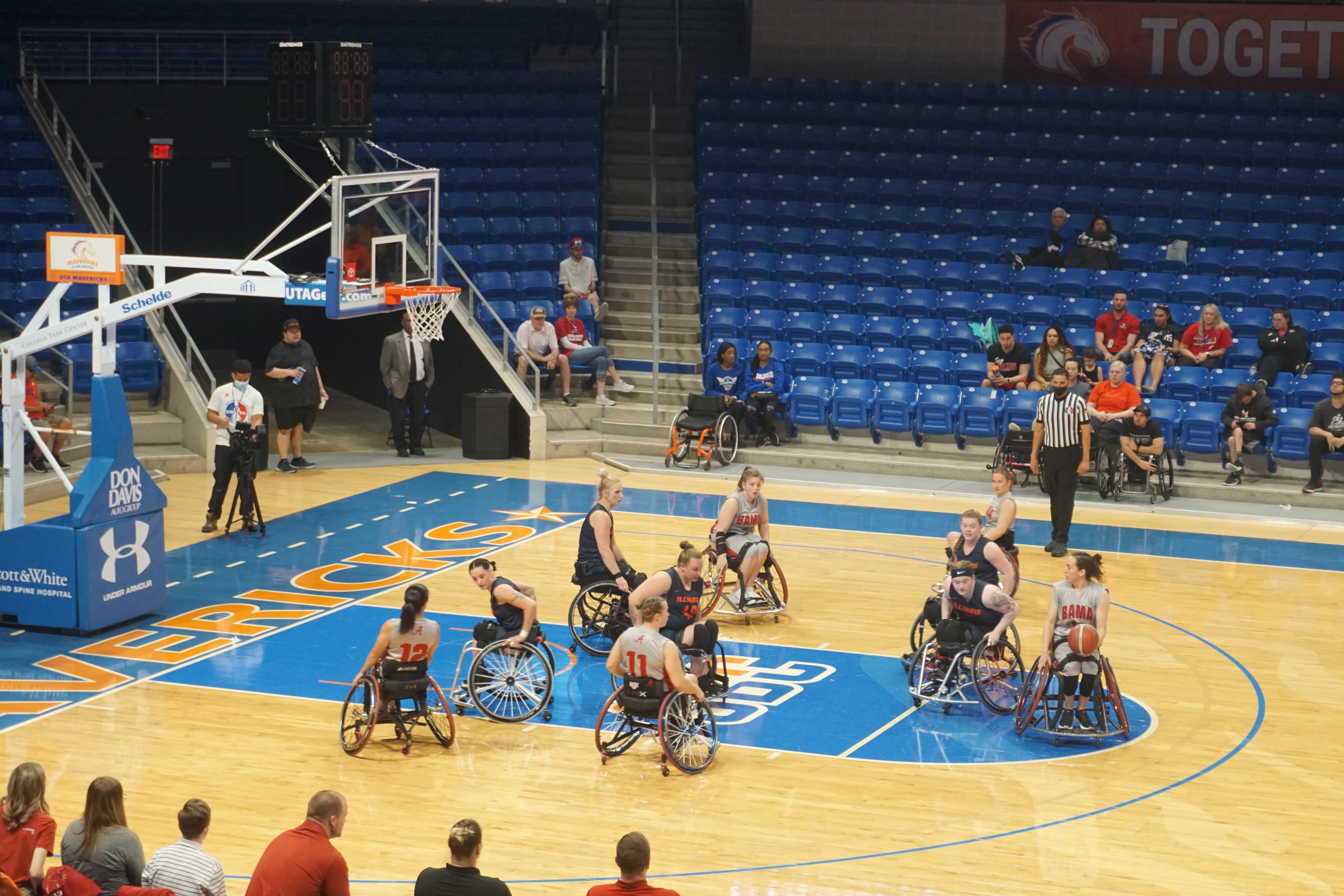
Women's wheelchair basketball playing against the Illinois Fighting Illini in the 2022 National Intercollegiate Wheelchair Basketball Tournament Women's Championship

The University of Alabama through University Recreation also fields a number of club sports of varying degrees of competitiveness, though most compete only with other teams from the southeastern US. The club sports include bowling, men's soccer, rugby, wrestling, lacrosse, men's volleyball, ice hockey, team handball, water polo, men's rowing (crew), cricket, cycling, disc golf, racquetball, table tennis, triathlon, ultimate frisbee, wheelchair basketball, water skiing, equestrian eventing, and bass fishing. The Crimson Tide's Water Skiing Team, Racquetball Team, and Wheelchair Basketball teams have the distinction of being among the nation's best, with national championships achieved by each of these teams.

=== Ice hockey ===
The men's ice hockey team, known as the Alabama Frozen Tide, competes inter-collegiately as a member of the South Eastern Collegiate Hockey Conference, an organization comprising mostly SEC schools that do not sponsor hockey, in the American Collegiate Hockey Association (ACHA) at the ACHA Division I level. Many clubs have played at this level before moving on to varsity status at their respective university. The team plays its home games at Pelham Civic Complex in nearby Birmingham. The program has taken a more advanced approach to recruiting including finding players in Canada. The practice is common among NCAA Division I programs. Taylor Joseph, the son of NHL goalkeeper Curtis Joseph, currently plays on the team.

Since 2006, Bama Hockey and the Frozen Tide has hosted sporting events for the Greater-Birmingham area at the Pelham Civic Center.

Alabama won the league title in 2012 and was runner-up in two other seasons.

The current head coach is John Bierchen, the first UA alumnus to return to his alma mater and coach the program.

=== Men's lacrosse ===
The men's lacrosse team competes in the SouthEastern Lacrosse Conference of the Men's Collegiate Lacrosse Association at the Division I level. The team is a club level team. The team plays at the University Recreation Fields and is currently coached by Craig Landru. The team was founded by Steven Shipowitz in the early 1980s. The Crimson Tide made their first appearance in the SELC Tournament in 2012, losing to the Florida State Seminoles 22–9 in the quarterfinals. The team briefly played in the Atlantic Coast Lacrosse Association in 2001, hosting the league tournament that season.

=== Women's lacrosse ===
The University of Alabama Women's Lacrosse team competes in the Southeastern Women's Lacrosse League (SWLL). The team is a club level team founded in 2004. The Crimson Tide made their first appearance in the SWLL Tournament in 2013, losing to the University of Georgia Lady Bulldogs in the semifinals and have appeared in the SWLL Tournament every year since. The team plays at the University Recreation Fields and is currently coached by Jason Sanderson who became head coach in 2013.

=== Rugby ===
Founded in 1973, Alabama Rugby is the oldest ongoing club sport at the university. Alabama rugby today competes in the Southeastern Collegiate Rugby Conference (SCRC) against its traditional SEC rivals. Alabama finished second in the west division of the conference in 2012 and in 2014 finished second in the SCRC, nationally ranked at No. 37. Alabama won the 2015 SCRC rugby sevens competition by beating Mississippi State 24–14 in the final, to earn a berth in the nationally televised 2015 Collegiate Rugby Championship. They additionally won the 2016 SCRC rugby 15s conference championship against Tennessee 12-8 and placed second in the 2018 tournament. Alabama rugby is led by head coach Eddie Buckner. The rugby team won the Los Angeles Sevens Collegiate Championship in 2020.

== National championships ==
Alabama has won 11 NCAA Division I team national championships in the following sports as of 2026:

- Men's (2)
  - Golf (2): 2013, 2014
- Women's (9)
  - Gymnastics (6): 1988, 1991, 1996, 2002, 2011, 2012
  - Cross Country (1): 2026
  - Softball (1): 2012
  - Golf (1): 2012

In addition, Alabama has claimed 18 national championships, as awarded by a variety of selectors at the highest level (currently Division I FBS) of football, for which the NCAA has never conducted a national championship.

- Football: 18 (1925, 1926, 1930, 1934, 1941, 1961, 1964, 1965, 1973, 1978, 1979, 1992, 2009, 2011, 2012, 2015, 2017, 2020)
- See also
  - SEC national team championships
  - List of NCAA schools with the most NCAA Division I championships

== Rivalries ==
The two main rivalries for the program are those with Auburn University and the University of Tennessee. The rivalry with the Auburn Tigers is especially heated, as the two compete annually in nearly all sports. The annual football meeting, nicknamed the Iron Bowl, is considered among the most intense college football rivalries, as well as one of the top rivalries in all sports according to Sports Illustrated and ESPN. Other rivalries include those against Mississippi State University in baseball and basketball (Alabama–Mississippi State rivalry), Louisiana State University in football (Alabama–LSU rivalry), the University of Mississippi in football (Alabama–Ole Miss rivalry), the University of Florida in softball, and the University of Georgia in gymnastics.

== Athletic academics ==
Alabama has student-athletes who have excelled in the classroom as well as on the field. The University of Alabama is eighth in the nation for the number of Academic-All Americans since 2000 from all universities in the United States. Among Division I BCS schools in the southeastern U.S., the University of Alabama is at the top of the list with the greatest number of Academic All-Americans since 2000.

Each of the University of Alabama's 21 varsity athletic teams scored significantly above the national standard of 925 in the NCAA's Academic Progress Rate (APR) of 2012. 14 Crimson Tide teams achieved scores equal to or above the national Division I average for the particular sport, and two teams achieved "perfect" APR scores, which placed them in the highest percentile in the nation.

== Athletics Foundation ==
The Crimson Tide Foundation, established in 2005, was created to promote and sustain long-term support for Alabama Athletics by engaging alumni, fans, and donors. It provides critical funding for scholarships, facilities, and program enhancements, ensuring the department's continued competitiveness and its ability to meet the needs of student-athletes.

== In popular media ==
The chorus of the 1978 hit song "Deacon Blues", by Steely Dan, ends with: "They call Alabama the Crimson Tide... call me Deacon Blues". "Deacon Blues" itself is a football reference, having originally been Deacon Jones but was renamed to avoid legal troubles.

The 1995 movie Crimson Tide depicts a mutiny on a submarine, USS Alabama.

== Proposed name change ==
According to his 1998 memoir Changing the Tide, after the 1977 plane crash that claimed the lives of several Lynyrd Skynyrd members, then-University President F. David Mathews seriously considered changing the name of the University's sports teams to the Crimson Skynyrds, in recognition of the band's inextricable link to the state of Alabama and the University's football culture. Ultimatley, Mathews remained grateful he made no change, citing that no member of the band was a University of Alabama alum, as well as drummer Artimus Pyle's 1993 conviction of attempted capital sexual battery and lewd assault on two girls.

== See also ==
- List of Southeastern Conference national championships § NCAA team championships
- List of NCAA schools with the most NCAA Division I championships § NCAA Division I Team Championships
