= University of Alabama traditions =

Aspect of University of Alabama culture

The University of Alabama is a school with many traditions. This article describes several of these traditions.

== Football ==
=== Beginnings of football at Alabama ===
According to a November 25, 1926 article in The Crimson White, football was first introduced at the University of Alabama in 1892 by W.G. Little of Livingston, Alabama, who had been a student at Andover, Massachusetts and "went to the University for the game."

Alabama's first football game was played in Birmingham on Friday afternoon, November 11, 1892, at the old Lakeview Park. Alabama defeated a team composed mostly of high schoolers 56-0. That Saturday, November 12, Alabama played the Birmingham Athletic Club, losing 5-4 when Ross, of B.A.C., kicked a 65-yard field goal. This field goal was a collegiate record at the time.

In 1896 the university's board of trustees passed a rule forbidding athletic teams from traveling off-campus. The following season only one game was played and in 1898 football was abandoned at Alabama. Student opposition to the ruling forced trustees to lift the travel ban and football was resumed in 1899. The 1918 season was canceled on account of World War I but the game was resumed the following year.

Alabama first gained national recognition for football in 1922 when it defeated the University of Pennsylvania 9-7 in Philadelphia. The following season Wallace Wade became head coach and in 1925 led the Crimson Tide to its first undefeated and untied season and its first trip to Pasadena, California, with a Rose Bowl invitation. On January 1, 1926, in the Rose Bowl, Alabama came from behind to upset the University of Washington 20-19.

=== The Crimson Tide ===
Early newspaper accounts of the university's football squad simply referred to them as the "varsity" or the "Crimson White". The first nickname popular with the media was the "Thin Red Line", which was used until 1906. Hugh Roberts, former sports editor of the Birmingham Age-Herald, is credited with coining the phrase "Crimson Tide" in an article describing the 1907 Iron Bowl played in Birmingham with Auburn a heavy favorite to win. The game was played in a sea of red mud which stained the Alabama white jerseys crimson. The headline for the article was "Crimson Tied", referring to the 6–6 tie Alabama had with Auburn, who had been heavily favored before the game.

=== The Elephant ===
There are two stories, perhaps both true, about how Alabama's football squad became associated with the elephant, both dating to the coaching tenure of Wallace Wade (1923–1930).

The earliest account attributes the Rosenberger's Birmingham Trunk Company for the elephant association. Owner J. D. Rosenberger, whose son was a student at the university, outfitted the undefeated 1926 team with "good luck" luggage tags for the trip to the 1927 Rose Bowl. The company's trademark, displayed on the tags, was a red elephant standing on a trunk. When the football team arrived in Pasadena, the reporters greeting them, including syndicated columnist Grantland Rice, associated their large size with the elephants on their luggage. When the 1930 team returned to the Rose Bowl, the company furnished leather suitcases, paid for by the Alumni Association, to each team member.

Another story dates to 1930. Following the October 4 game against Ole Miss, Atlanta Journal sports writer and Hall of Fame former Georgia Tech back Everett Strupper wrote:

At the end of the quarter, the earth started to tremble, there was a distant rumble that continued to grow. Some excited fan in the stands bellowed, 'Hold your horses, the elephants are coming,' and out stamped this Alabama varsity. It was the first time that I had seen it and the size of the entire eleven nearly knocked me cold, men that I had seen play last year looking like they had nearly doubled in size.

Yet, despite the unofficial status as the Crimson Tide's mascot, the elephant was very much part of the school's football traditions by the 1940s. It was in that decade that a live elephant mascot named "Alamite" was a regular sight on game days in Tuscaloosa. For several years it was traditional for the pachyderm to lead the homecoming parade and Alamite would also bear that year's queen onto the field prior to the game.

Sports writers continued to refer to Alabama as the "Red Elephants" afterward, referring to their crimson jerseys. The 1930 team shut out eight of ten opponents, allowing a total of only 13 points all season. The "Red Elephants" rolled up 217 points that season, including a 24-0 victory over Washington State in the Rose Bowl.

Despite these early associations of the elephant to the University of Alabama, the university did not officially accept the elephant as university mascot until 1979.

Alabama's elephant mascot is known as "Big Al".

== The Million Dollar Band ==
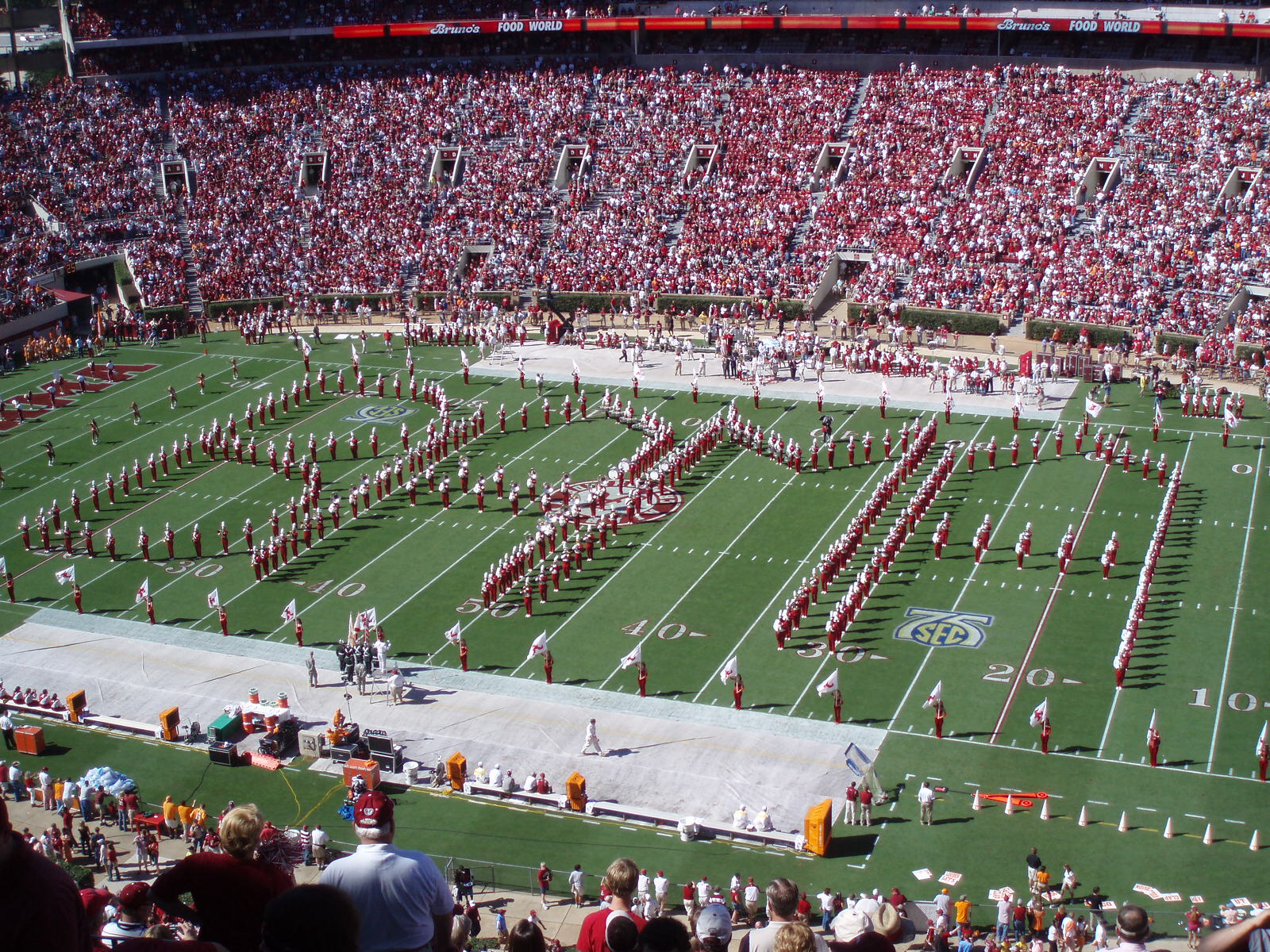
The Million Dollar Band performing at a football game

The Million Dollar Band, the University of Alabama's marching band, was founded in 1912 with 14 members under the direction of Dr. Gustav Wittig. In 1917, the band became a military band and was led by students until 1927.

The Million Dollar Band is the largest performing organization on campus, with around 400+ members. The September 1992 issue of Southern Living selected the Million Dollar Band as one of the top ten most outstanding bands in the South. In 2003 it became the twenty-second band to be honored with the Sudler Trophy, given by the Sousa Foundation to recognize "collegiate marching bands of particular excellence that have made outstanding contributions to the American way of life." Additionally, the Million Dollar Band has been nationally televised more than any other college marching band in the country.

=== Naming of the Million Dollar Band ===
There are two stories to the naming of the Million Dollar Band. The main one is from a time when Alabama's football wasn't doing so well. They were playing Georgia Tech and the coach of Georgia Tech stated, "Your football team isn't worth a nickel, but you have a million dollar band." And so the name stuck.

In the second story, W. C. "Champ" Pickens bestowed the name "Million Dollar Band" after the 1922 football game against Georgia Tech. Though accounts vary, it is reported that in order for the band to attend the game they had to solicit funds from local businesses. They were able to collect enough funds to ride in a tourist sleeper to the game. After the game, which Alabama lost 33-7, an Atlanta sportswriter commented to Pickens, "You don't have much of a team; what do you have at Alabama?" Pickens replied, "A Million Dollar Band."

=== Directors of the Million Dollar Band ===
- 1913–1917: Gustav Wittig
- 1917–1927: Student-led
- 1927–1934: Captain H. H. Turner
- 1935–1968: Colonel Carleton K. Butler
- 1969–1970: Earl Dunn
- 1971–1983: James Ferguson
- 1984–2002: Kathryn B. Scott
- 2003 – present: Kenneth Ozzello

== School songs ==
=== Alma Mater ===
Like many college alma mater songs written around the turn of the 20th century, the Alabama Alma Mater is set to the tune of "Annie Lisle", a ballad written in the 1850s. The words are usually credited as, "Helen Vickers, 1908", although it is not clear whether that was when it was written or if that was her graduating class. The lyrics of the alma mater:

Alabama, listen, Mother, To our vows of love, To thyself and to each other, Faithful friends we’ll prove.

Faithful, loyal, firm and true, Heart bound to heart will beat. Year by year, the ages through Until in Heaven we meet.

College days are swiftly fleeting, Soon we’ll leave their halls Ne’er to join another meeting ‘Neath their hallowed walls.

Faithful, loyal, firm and true Heart bound to heart will beat Year by year, the ages through Until in Heaven we meet.

So, farewell, dear Alma Mater May thy name, we pray, Be rev’renced ever, pure, and stainless As it is today.

Faithful, loyal, firm and true Heart bound to heart will beat Year by year, the ages through Until in Heaven we meet.

=== "Yea Alabama" ===
Following Alabama's 1926 Rose Bowl victory over Washington, a contest was held by The Rammer-Jammer, a student newspaper, for the composition of a fight song with a prize of US$75 (adjusted for inflation, US$1332). Several entries were submitted to a panel overseen by the Music Department, and the winning entry, "Yea Alabama", was adopted. The composer, Ethelred Lundy (Epp) Sykes, a student in the School of Engineering, was the editor of The Rammer-Jammer, and played piano in a jazz ensemble, The Capstone Five. He won the university's Pan-Hellenic Cup in 1926 for overall achievement, both academically, athletically, and in student affairs. The song achieved considerable popularity during the 20s and 30s. Sykes went on to become a brigadier general in the U.S. Air Force, and donated the copyright and future royalties to the university in 1947. The Million Dollar Band plays only the chorus at football games such as after touchdowns and field goals.

A Dixieland jazz version of the song appeared on the 1950 Percy Faith album Football Songs (later re-released as Touchdown!) and was played extensively across the state in the 1960s and 1970s as the music bed of radio commercials for sporting goods stores. It was also used as the theme music for The Bear Bryant Show.

The last words of the song, "Roll Tide!", have become the standard cheer, greeting, and farewell among Alabama fans.

The fight song, as played today, has been shortened to begin with the words "Yea Alabama"; however, the original version had a verse that went at the beginning. The original version did not have "Roll Tide, Roll Tide!" at the end, but was added as a chant immediately following the last line of the song.

Amusingly, the song refers to several "traditional" opponents, but two of them are no longer regular opponents. Georgia Tech ("Yellow Jackets") left the SEC in the early 1960s, and has only infrequently filled one of the non-conference game slots, and The University of the South Tigers (also called Sewanee) withdrew from the SEC in 1940, de-emphasized athletics, and no longer competes at the Division I level.

The trio (no longer played in most occasions):

Let the Sewanee Tiger scratch,
Let the Yellow Jacket sting,
Let the Georgia Bulldog bite,
Alabama still is right!
And whether win or lose we smile,
For that's Bama's fighting style:
You're Dixie's football pride, Crimson Tide!

The chorus:

Yea, Alabama! Drown ’em Tide!
Every ‘Bama man’s behind you,
Hit your stride!
Go teach the Bulldogs to behave,
Send the Yellow Jackets to a watery grave!
And if a man starts to weaken,
That’s a shame!
For Bama’s pluck and grit have
Writ her name in Crimson flame!
Fight on, fight on, fight on men!
Remember the Rose Bowl, we’ll win then!
So roll on to victory,
Hit your stride,
You’re Dixie’s football pride,
Crimson Tide,
Roll Tide, Roll Tide!

== Rammer Jammer Cheer ==
The "Rammer Jammer Cheer" is a traditional cheer. The lyrics originate from The Rammer-Jammer, a student magazine in the 1920s, and the yellowhammer, Alabama's state bird. The term yellowhammer was originally used to describe Confederate soldiers from Alabama who wore bright yellow cloth on their uniforms; when the soldiers marched into the city of Hopkinsville, Kentucky, supporters of the Confederacy cheered them with the chant "yellowhammer, yellowhammer". During and after the American Civil War, the term continued to be used and Alabama became known as the "Yellowhammer State".

The cadence of the cheer is a direct takeaway of the Ole Miss cheer "Hotty Toddy" after then Ole Miss marching band director James Ferguson was appointed director of the Million Dollar Band. The cheer is still referred to as "Ole Miss", and today the drum major's signal is still the motioning of one arm in a full circle (an "O").

The cheer was a pregame ritual until the early 2000s, chanting "We're gonna' beat the hell out of you!", but this was considered unsportsmanlike and banned. The university also briefly forbade the Million Dollar Band from playing it after games, because of its taunting nature. The move was met with a significant amount of criticism. In a vote at Homecoming 2005, the question was posed to students of whether the cheer should be banned. Ninety-eight percent of students voted in favor of keeping the cheer. Before the university's attempt to remove the cheer, it was played before kickoff and at the end of the game. The cheer is now only played in the closing minutes when victory is certain, and is traditionally chanted twice. On at least one occasion (during Alabama's victory over Auburn in the 2008 Iron Bowl, Alabama's first in the series since 2001), it was repeated an additional four times to signify the breaking of the 6-game losing streak to Auburn. After Alabama's victory over the Florida Gators in the 2009 SEC Championship Game, as well as after Alabama's victory over the Texas Longhorns in the 2010 Citi BCS National Championship Game, the cheer was played nine times. Depending on what team Alabama is playing, the Million Dollar Band and fans will call out to the opposing team by chanting the team's mascot with the exception being Auburn University; they do not refer to them as the Tigers, just as Auburn.

In other instances, the nickname of the opposing team is substituted; for instance, a victory over the University of Tennessee would change the opening lyrics to "Hey Vols!" (short for Volunteers, the nickname/mascot for the University of Tennessee). Also, when the cheer was played before kickoff, fans would replace the lyrics "We just" with "We're gonna." The cheer is no longer played before kickoff; however, there are a few special occasions where the cheer is played before a football game. One such instance occurs when Alabama plays Tennessee in Knoxville. The night before the football game, the Alabama Alumni Association hosts a riverboat cruise in which Alabama alumni from all around reunite for a night. During the two trips the riverboat cruise takes over the course of the night, the Million Dollar Band members that are a part of the cruises' pep band will play the Rammer Jammer cheer. in the direction of other boats on the river flying a Volunteers' flag. Within the Million Dollar Band, there is taboo around singing the words outside of an actual Crimson Tide victory. When the cheer is played in these situations, members of the band simply play the notes and mime the motions of the cheer without saying any of the words.

Author Warren St. John titled his 2004 bestseller about obsessive sports fans Rammer Jammer Yellow Hammer after the cheer. The cheer was most noted during the years of Coach Paul "Bear" Bryant and his head cheerleader Mickey Grigsby.

=== "Reverse Rammer Jammer" ===
With the Rammer Jammer being well known among college sports fans, a variant of the cheer has arisen that is sometimes used by the fans of opposing teams when they beat Alabama. Dubbed the "Reverse Rammer Jammer," the beat and music are the same, but the words of the chant are changed to, "Hey, Alabama! We just beat the hell out of you, Rammer Jammer Yellowhammer, go to hell Alabama!" Due to the intense rivalry between UA and Auburn University, the Reverse Rammer Jammer is most often heard being performed by Auburn fans following a victory in the Iron Bowl.
