= Big Al (mascot) =

Mascot of the University of Alabama

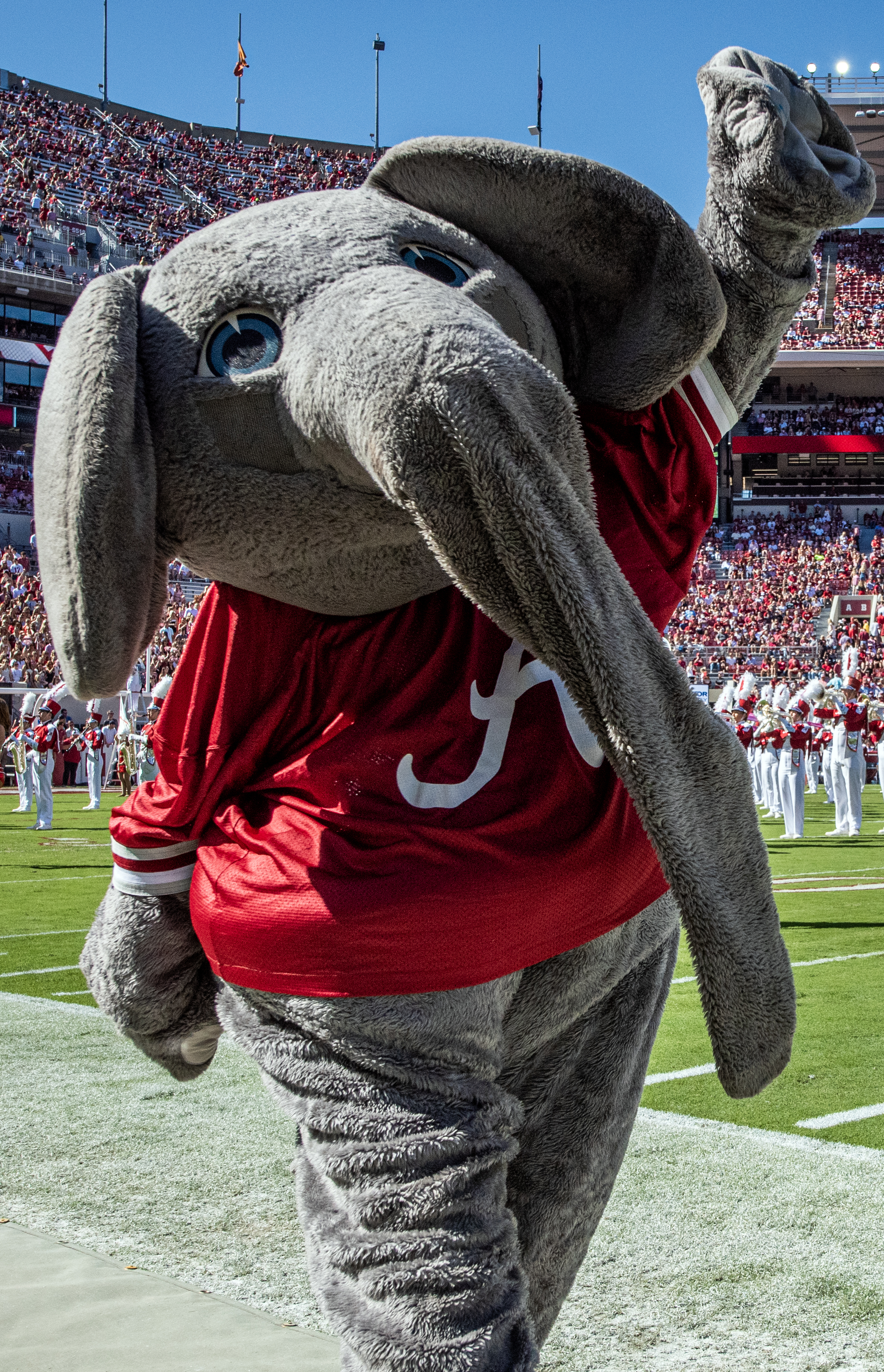
- Big Al at Bryant-Denny Stadium in 2024
- University: University of Alabama
- Conference: SEC
- Description: Anthropomorphic elephant
- Origin of name: University of Alabama
- First seen: 1980

Big Al is the costumed elephant mascot of the University of Alabama Crimson Tide in Tuscaloosa, Alabama.

== History ==
On October 8, 1930, a sportswriter for the Atlanta Journal, Everett Strupper, wrote about the previous weekend's Alabama-Ole Miss football game. He wrote, "That Alabama team of 1930 is a typical [Coach Wallace] Wade machine, powerful, big, tough, fast, aggressive, well-schooled in fundamentals, and the best blocking team for this early in the season that I have ever seen. When those big brutes hit you I mean you go down and stay down, often for an additional two minutes."

Strupper, using the flair for the dramatic common in sportswriting at the time, wrote, "At the end of the quarter, the earth started to tremble, there was a distant rumble that continued to grow. Some excited fan in the stands bellowed, 'Hold your horses, the elephants are coming!' and out stamped this Alabama varsity." Strupper and other writers would continue to refer to Alabama as the "Red Elephants," the "red" as a nod to the players' crimson jerseys, and the name stuck throughout what became a national championship season and beyond.

Despite the nickname, it would be nearly five decades before Alabama recognized the animal as its official mascot. However, elephants featured prominently to gameday tradition long before this point. Throughout the 1940s, for instance, the University kept a live elephant mascot named "Alamite" that was a regular sight on game days, and it would carry the year's Homecoming queen onto the field every year prior to kickoff at the Homecoming game. By the 1950s, keeping a live elephant year-round proved to be too expensive for the University. Instead, the UA spirit committee started hiring elephants, often from traveling circuses passing through or by Tuscaloosa, for every homecoming.

In the early 1960s, Melford Espey, Jr., then a student, was the first to wear an elephant head costume to portray the Crimson Tide's unofficial mascot. Espey later became a university administrator, and football coach Paul "Bear" Bryant asked him to take responsibility when student groups asked to resurrect the costumed mascot in the late 1970s.

Big Al greeting fans in 2010

The mascot known as "Big Al" today was the brainchild of University of Alabama student Walt Tart, member of Tau Kappa Epsilon fraternity. In 1979, he was meeting with the homecoming chairman, Ann Paige, as they were trying to come up with something different for the school's homecoming parade. He told Paige that several schools in the Southeastern Conference had obtained mascot costumes and proposed that the University of Alabama should get one as well. By contacting the University of Kentucky and a few other schools, Tart discovered that their mascots were designed and constructed by the Walt Disney Company. He received a price quote from Disney for the design and construction of the elephant costume. Since funding for the costume would have to come from the athletic department, Tart and Paige set up a meeting with Coach Bryant, who was the football coach and athletic director of the University. Bryant was very easy to talk to and teased them about having a real elephant on the field and the mess it would make. The two assured him that it was just a person in an elephant costume and not a real elephant, to which Bryant grinned and said he knew all along. Bryant said he thought elephants were very smart and a little slow, but approved the funds for the elephant costume.

The Big Al costume was first officially worn in 1980. The elephant became UA's unofficial mascot in the 1930s. And although elephant costumes appeared at games in the 1960s, it wasn't until 1979 that the university officially recognized the elephant as its mascot. Big Al made his first official appearance at the 1980 Sugar Bowl when UA played Arkansas. Student Hugh Dye earned the honor to bring "Big Al" back to life in New Orleans, followed by Kent Howard and Maury Smith to kick off the inaugural 1980 season and roam the sidelines.

Big Al celebrated his first year with Bear Bryant's 300th win against the Kentucky Wildcats and a victory against the Baylor Bears in the 1981 Cotton Bowl. Since then, the elephant mascot has been a fan favorite among Tide fans. As the Crimson Tide does not feature a prominent logo on their helmets or uniforms, Big Al's likeness appears on much of the merchandise.

Every April during the weekend of the A-Day spring football game, there is a three-day tryout process for UA students who want to become Big Al. The first day consists of an interview and clinic, where the candidates learn to emulate the character and walk of Big Al. The second day consists of more clinic, as well as being judged on the walk and participating in a band cheer. Later that afternoon, the candidates come either prepared with a minute-and-a-half skit or they can make an impromptu one at tryouts. Each candidate performs their skits for a score, and then there is a final cut before A-Day. Whoever makes the final cut is invited to A-Day for the final tryout, which consists of a “field walk” before the game. This is where they are scored for going in public in a non-athletic event setting and interacting with the public. After this, they perform for 10–15 minutes each during the game, mimicking a “normal” gameday atmosphere. The final announcement of the next year's mascot team happens immediately following the spring game.

While allowed to do some planned photo-ops with other mascots (such as Aubie from archrival Auburn University), Big Al, per University rules, is generally not allowed to interact with opponent mascots on the field. This is due to a 2002 incident between Big Al and Seymour of Southern Miss during a game in Tuscaloosa. A "fight" was scripted before the game, in which the rules were that Big Al “loses” the fight in front of the visitors’ section, and Big Al dominates in front of his student section. The scripted fight suddenly became unscripted after Seymour deviated from the set rules, and a raucous fight on the sidelines between the two ensued.

Big Al is sometimes joined by a female counterpart, an elephant named "Big Alice," at athletics events.
