= Roll Tide =

Athletic rallying cry for the University of Alabama

Roll Tide (or Roll Tide Roll) is the rallying cry for the Alabama Crimson Tide athletic teams. The trademark to the phrase is claimed by the University of Alabama, with licensing and marketing by The Collegiate Licensing Company.

== History ==
The origins of 'Roll Tide' are unclear. From 1892 to 1906, commentators popularized the 'Thin Red Line' nickname for the university team, later replaced by 'Crimson Tide'. The university fight song originally contained the line "Roll to vic-try", later replaced with the phrase roll tide.

Dr. Dorothy Worden-Chambers attributes 'roll tide' as a "cultural keyword... emblematic of the culture of the [University of Alabama]."

The CSS Alabama was a very successful Commerce Raider during the Civil War. Many songs were written about it, but one of the more popular songs was Roll, Alabama, Roll - which was a popular English sea chanty. It seems that this might have been the inspiration for the Crimson Tide's rallying cry.

== In popular culture ==
=== Music ===
- "Roll Tide" is the name of a dramatic piece of orchestral music that was composed by Hans Zimmer for the 1995 Hollywood Pictures film Crimson Tide. Most of the film is set aboard the USS Alabama, an Ohio-class nuclear-powered fleet ballistic missile submarine.
- "Roll Tide" is the name of a song by the California-based American folk-rock band Dawes on their studio album We're All Gonna Die, released in September 2016. The song is a melancholy lamentation about love, forgiveness, and reconciliation; it alludes to the Alabama Crimson Tide rallying cry and to the state of Alabama itself, but it also draws upon a more literal, water-based metaphor relating to the word "tide".
