= 2018 Alabama Crimson Tide football team =

American college football season

2018 Alabama Crimson Tide football

SEC champion SEC Western Division champion Orange Bowl champion

SEC Championship Game, W 35–28 vs. Georgia

Orange Bowl (CFP Semifinal), W 45–34 vs. Oklahoma CFP National Championship L 16–44 vs. Clemson
- Conference: Southeastern Conference
- Western Division

Ranking
- Coaches: No. 2
- AP: No. 2
- Record: 14–1 (8–0 SEC)
- Head coach: Nick Saban (12th season)
- Offensive coordinator: Mike Locksley (2nd season)
- Co-offensive coordinator: Josh Gattis (1st season)
- Offensive scheme: Pro spread
- Defensive coordinator: Tosh Lupoi (2nd season)
- Co-defensive coordinator: Pete Golding (1st season)
- Base defense: 3–4
- Captains: Damien Harris; Hale Hentges; Christian Miller; Ross Pierschbacher
- Home stadium: Bryant–Denny Stadium

Uniform
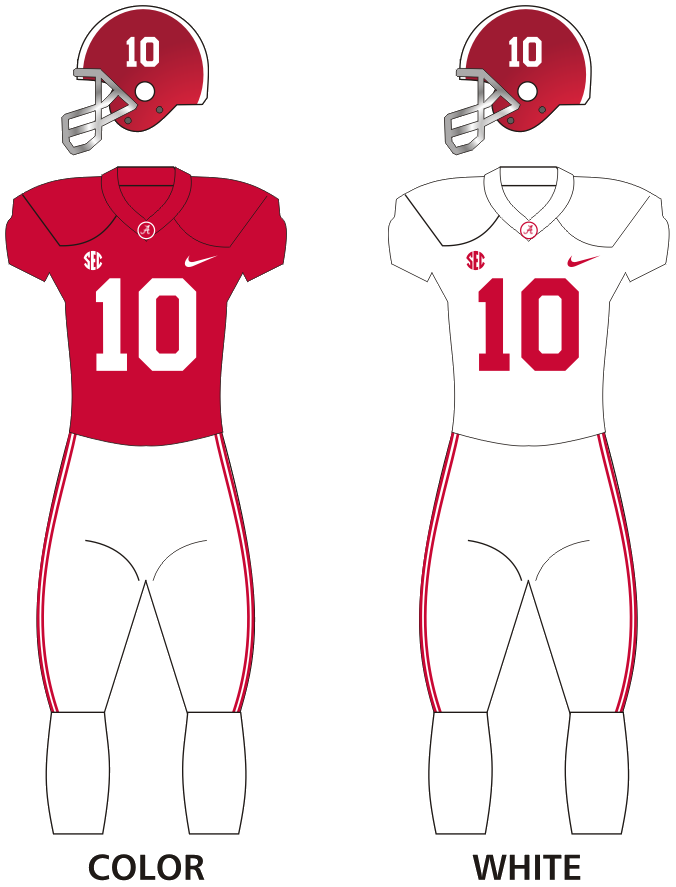

2018 Southeastern Conference football standings
	Conf.			Overall
Team	W		L	W		L
Eastern Division
No. T–7 Georgia x	7	–	1	11	–	3
No. 12 Kentucky	5	–	3	10	–	3
No. T–7 Florida	5	–	3	10	–	3
South Carolina	4	–	4	7	–	6
Missouri	4	–	4	8	–	5
Vanderbilt	3	–	5	6	–	7
Tennessee	2	–	6	5	–	7
Western Division
No. 2 Alabama x$^	8	–	0	14	–	1
No. 16 Texas A&M	5	–	3	9	–	4
No. 6 LSU	5	–	3	10	–	3
Mississippi State*	4	–	4	8	–	5
Auburn	3	–	5	8	–	5
Ole Miss	1	–	7	5	–	7
Arkansas	0	–	8	2	–	10
Championship: Alabama 35, Georgia 28
^ – College Football Playoff participant; $ – Conference champion; x – Division champion/co-champions; * Mississippi State vacated four conference and eight total wins due to NCAA violations.; Rankings from AP Poll

The 2018 Alabama Crimson Tide football team represented the University of Alabama in the 2018 NCAA Division I FBS football season. This season marked the Crimson Tide's 124th overall season, 85th as a member of the Southeastern Conference (SEC), and 27th within the SEC Western Division. They played their home games at Bryant–Denny Stadium in Tuscaloosa, Alabama and were led by twelfth-year head coach Nick Saban.

Alabama, coming off a national championship winning season in 2017, began the season ranked first in the AP Poll for the third consecutive year and fifth time under Nick Saban. The Tide opened the year with a dominant victory over Louisville in the Camping World Kickoff played in Orlando, Florida. Alabama won their remaining regular season games to achieve their second undefeated regular season in three years. As champions of the SEC's Western Division, they played in the 2018 SEC Championship Game, defeating Eastern Division champion Georgia, in a rematch of the 2017 national title game, 35–28, to win the school's 27th SEC title. In the final College Football Playoff rankings of the year, Alabama was ranked first, which earned them their fifth consecutive playoff berth and a spot in the 2018 Orange Bowl against fourth-ranked Oklahoma. Alabama won that game 45–34 to advance to the 2019 College Football Playoff National Championship against Clemson, their fourth consecutive playoff match-up against Clemson and the third to be in a national title game. The Crimson Tide lost in a blowout, 44–16, representing the Tide's worst loss in the Saban era.

The Crimson Tide were led on offense by sophomore quarterback Tua Tagovailoa, who won the starting job over two-year starter Jalen Hurts. Tagovailoa set the NCAA FBS record for passing efficiency rating (199.4), (Note: This record was broken the following season by LSU's Joe Burrow, with a rating of 202.0 in 2019.) was a consensus first-team All-American, and finished second in voting for the Heisman Trophy behind Oklahoma's Kyler Murray. Hurts, despite losing the starting role, received praise for sticking with the team and helping to mount a comeback in the SEC Championship Game when Tagovailoa went down with an ankle injury. Also receiving consensus first-team All-America honors on offense were wide receiver Jerry Jeudy, winner of the Biletnikoff Award, and offensive tackle Jonah Williams. On defense, Alabama featured two consensus All-Americans, defensive lineman Quinnen Williams and defensive back Deionte Thompson.

== Offseason ==
=== Offseason departures ===
Name	Number	Pos.	Height	Weight	Year	Hometown	Notes
Minkah Fitzpatrick	#29	DB	6'1	202	Junior	Jersey City, NJ	Declared for the 2018 NFL draft
Ronnie Harrison	#15	DB	6'3	214	Junior	Tallahassee, FL	Declared for the 2018 NFL draft
Daron Payne	#94	DT	6'2	308	Junior	Irondale, AL	Declared for the 2018 NFL draft
Calvin Ridley	#3	WR	6'1	190	Junior	Coconut Creek, FL	Declared for the 2018 NFL draft
Bo Scarbrough	#9	RB	6'2	235	Junior	Northport, AL	Declared for the 2018 NFL draft
Cam Sims	#17	WR	6'5	214	Senior	Monroe, LA	Graduated
Anthony Averett	#28	CB	6'0	185	Senior	Woodbury, NJ	Graduated
Tony Brown	#2	DB	6'0	198	Senior	Beaumont, TX	Graduated
Rashaan Evans	#32	LB	6'3	234	Senior	Auburn, AL	Graduated
Levi Wallace	#39	CB	6'0	179	Senior	Tucson, AZ	Graduated
Bradley Bozeman	#75	C	6'5	314	Senior	Roanoke, AL	Graduated
Mekhi Brown	#48	LB	6'4	249	RS Sophomore	Columbus, GA	Transferred to Tennessee State.
Da'Shawn Hand	#9	DE	6'4	288	Senior	Woodbridge, VA	Graduated
J. K. Scott	#10	P	6'6	202	Senior	Denver, CO	Graduated
Joshua Frazier	#69	DT	6'4	315	Senior	Springdale, AR	Graduated
Dallas Warmack	#59	OL	6'2	299	RS Sophomore	Atlanta, GA	Transferred to Oregon.

=== Recruiting ===
The 2018 football recruiting cycle was the first in which the NCAA authorized two signing periods for high school seniors in that sport. In addition to the traditional spring period starting with National Signing Day on February 7, 2018, a new early signing period was introduced, with the first such period falling from December 20–22, 2017.

College recruiting
Name	Hometown	School	Height	Weight	Commit date
Ale Kaho; LB	Reno, Nevada	Reno	6 ft 1 in (1.85 m)	218 lb (99 kg)	Dec 16, 2017
Ale Kaho; LB	Recruit ratings: Scout: Rivals: 247Sports: ESPN: (78)				
Eyabi Anoma #2 DE	Baltimore, MD	St. Frances Academy	6 ft 6 in (1.98 m)	223 lb (101 kg)	Dec 20, 2017
Eyabi Anoma #2 DE	Recruit ratings: Scout: Rivals: 247Sports: ESPN: (94)				
Xavier Williams #3 ATH	Hollywood, FL	Chaminade-Madonna College Preparatory School	6 ft 1 in (1.85 m)	190 lb (86 kg)	Jan 17, 2017
Xavier Williams #3 ATH	Recruit ratings: Scout: Rivals: 247Sports: ESPN: (87)				
Emil Ekiyor Jr. #3 OG	Indianapolis, IN	Cathedral HS	6 ft 3 in (1.91 m)	339 lb (154 kg)	Oct 29, 2017
Emil Ekiyor Jr. #3 OG	Recruit ratings: Scout: Rivals: 247Sports: ESPN: (85)				
Christian Barmore #4 DT	Philadelphia, PA	Neumann–Goretti HS	6 ft 5 in (1.96 m)	290 lb (130 kg)	Dec 20, 2017
Christian Barmore #4 DT	Recruit ratings: Scout: Rivals: 247Sports: ESPN: (85)				
Stephon Wynn #9 DE	Bradenton, FL	IMG Academy	6 ft 4 in (1.93 m)	279 lb (127 kg)	Jul 1, 2017
Stephon Wynn #9 DE	Recruit ratings: Scout: Rivals: 247Sports: ESPN: (84)				
Tommy Brown #10 OT	Santa Ana, CA	Mater Dei HS	6 ft 7 in (2.01 m)	315 lb (143 kg)	Jul 21, 2017
Tommy Brown #10 OT	Recruit ratings: Scout: Rivals: 247Sports: ESPN: (85)				
Saivion Smith #1 CB	St. Petersburg, FL	Mississippi Gulf Coast CC (JC)	6 ft 1 in (1.85 m)	185 lb (84 kg)	Dec 6, 2017
Saivion Smith #1 CB	Recruit ratings: Scout: Rivals: 247Sports: ESPN: (84)				
Josh Jobe #15 CB	Cheshire, CT	Cheshire Academy	6 ft 0 in (1.83 m)	178 lb (81 kg)	Dec 16, 2017
Josh Jobe #15 CB	Recruit ratings: Scout: Rivals: 247Sports: ESPN: (84)				
Jordan Davis #12 DE	Memphis, TN	Southwind HS	6 ft 5 in (1.96 m)	238 lb (108 kg)	Dec 10, 2016
Jordan Davis #12 DE	Recruit ratings: Scout: Rivals: 247Sports: ESPN: (84)				
Cameron Latu #16 DE	Salt Lake City, UT	Olympus HS	6 ft 5 in (1.96 m)	236 lb (107 kg)	Aug 4, 2017
Cameron Latu #16 DE	Recruit ratings: Scout: Rivals: 247Sports: ESPN: (83)				
Patrick Surtain II #1 CB	Plantation, FL	American Heritage HS	6 ft 2 in (1.88 m)	192 lb (87 kg)	Feb 7, 2018
Patrick Surtain II #1 CB	Recruit ratings: Scout: Rivals: 247Sports: ESPN: (93)				
Jalyn Armour-Davis #28 CB	Mobile, AL	St. Paul's Episcopal School	6 ft 0 in (1.83 m)	165 lb (75 kg)	Jun 23, 2017
Jalyn Armour-Davis #28 CB	Recruit ratings: Scout: Rivals: 247Sports: ESPN: (82)				
Slade Bolden #64 ATH	West Monroe, LA	West Monroe HS	5 ft 11 in (1.80 m)	195 lb (88 kg)	Aug 3, 2017
Slade Bolden #64 ATH	Recruit ratings: Scout: Rivals: 247Sports: ESPN: (77)				
Skyler DeLong #6 PK	Fort Mill, SC	Nation Ford HS	6 ft 2 in (1.88 m)	180 lb (82 kg)	Jun 15, 2017
Skyler DeLong #6 PK	Recruit ratings: Scout: Rivals: 247Sports: ESPN: (77)				
Michael Parker #26 TE-Y	Huntsville, AL	Westminster Christian Academy (AL)	6 ft 6 in (1.98 m)	230 lb (100 kg)	Dec 6, 2017
Michael Parker #26 TE-Y	Recruit ratings: Scout: Rivals: 247Sports: ESPN: (76)				
Jerome Ford; RB	Seffner, FL	Armwood HS	5 ft 10 in (1.78 m)	195 lb (88 kg)	Dec 17, 2017
Jerome Ford; RB	Recruit ratings: Scout: Rivals: 247Sports: ESPN: (81)				
Eddie Smith #62 CB	Slidell, LA	Salmen HS	6 ft 0 in (1.83 m)	172 lb (78 kg)	Feb 7, 2018
Eddie Smith #62 CB	Recruit ratings: Scout: Rivals: 247Sports: ESPN: (78)				
Jaylen Moody #33 LB	Conway, SC	Conway HS	6 ft 1 in (1.85 m)	225 lb (102 kg)	Feb 7, 2018
Jaylen Moody #33 LB	Recruit ratings: Scout: Rivals: 247Sports: ESPN: (75)				
Jaylen Waddle #12 WR	Bellaire, TX	Episcopal HS	5 ft 10 in (1.78 m)	169 lb (77 kg)	Feb 7, 2018
Jaylen Waddle #12 WR	Recruit ratings: Scout: Rivals: 247Sports: ESPN: (85)				
Braxton Barker; QB	Hoover, AL	Spain Park HS	5 ft 11 in (1.80 m)	175 lb (79 kg)	Walk On (02/05/18)
Braxton Barker; QB	Recruit ratings: Scout: Rivals: 247Sports: ESPN: (NR)				
Overall recruit ranking: Scout: 5 Rivals: 10 247Sports: 5 ESPN: 6
Note: In many cases, Scout, Rivals, 247Sports, On3, and ESPN may conflict in their listings of height and weight.; In these cases, the average was taken. ESPN grades are on a 100-point scale.; Sources: "2018 Alabama Football Commitment List". Rivals.; "2018 Alabama Commits". Scout.; "2018 Players Commitments – Alabama". ESPN.; "Scout.com Team Recruiting Rankings". Scout.; "2018 Team Ranking". Rivals.com.; "2018 Alabama Crimson Tide football team". 247Sports.

=== Incoming transfers ===
Alabama added one transfer to the 2018 roster.

Name	No.	Pos.	Height	Weight	Year	Hometown	Prev. School
Austin Jones	#29	PK	5'10"	205	Senior (Grad Transfer)	Orlando, FL	Temple

=== Returning starters ===
Offense

Player	Class	Position
Jalen Hurts	Junior	Quarterback
Damien Harris	Senior	Running back
Jerry Jeudy	Sophomore	Wide receiver
Henry Ruggs	Sophomore	Wide receiver
DeVonta Smith	Sophomore	Wide receiver
Hale Hentges	Senior	Tight end
Lester Cotton	Senior	Guard
Ross Pierschbacher	Senior	Guard
Jonah Williams	Junior	Offensive tackle

Defense

Player	Class	Position
Isaiah Buggs	Senior	Defensive end
Terrell Lewis	Junior	Linebacker
Mack Wilson	Junior	Linebacker
Dylan Moses	Sophomore	Linebacker
Raekwon Davis	Junior	Defensive tackle

Special teams

Player	Class	Position
Austin Jones	GS Senior	Placekicker
Trevon Diggs	Junior	Kick returner

=== Position key ===
Back	B	Center	C	Cornerback	CB	Defensive back	DB
Defensive end	DE	Defensive lineman	DL	Defensive tackle	DT	End	E
Fullback	FB	Guard	G	Halfback	HB	Kicker	K
Kickoff returner	KR	Offensive tackle	OT	Offensive lineman	OL	Linebacker	LB
Long snapper	LS	Punter	P	Punt returner	PR	Quarterback	QB
Running back	RB	Safety	S	Tight end	TE	Wide receiver	WR

== Preseason ==
=== Award watchlists ===
Listed in the order that they were released

Award	Player	Position	Year
Lott Trophy	Anfernee Jennings	LB	JR
Chuck Bednarik Award	Anfernee Jennings	LB	JR
Chuck Bednarik Award	Raekwon Davis	DE	JR
Chuck Bednarik Award	Mack Wilson	LB	JR
Maxwell Award	Jalen Hurts	QB	JR
Maxwell Award	Tua Tagovailoa	QB	SO
Maxwell Award	Damien Harris	RB	SR
Davey O'Brien Award	Jalen Hurts	QB	JR
Doak Walker Award	Damien Harris	RB	SR
John Mackey Award	Hale Hentges	TE	SR
Rimington Trophy	Ross Pierschbacher	OL	RS SR
Butkus Award	Anfernee Jennings	LB	JR
Butkus Award	Dylan Moses	LB	SO
Butkus Award	Mack Wilson	LB	JR
Bronko Nagurski Trophy	Raekwon Davis	DE	JR
Outland Trophy	Jonah Williams	OL	JR
Outland Trophy	Ross Pierschbacher	OL	RS SR
Paul Hornung Award	Trevon Diggs	DB	JR
Wuerffel Trophy	Hale Hentges	TE	SR
Walter Camp Award	Raekwon Davis	DL	JR
Walter Camp Award	Damien Harris	RB	SR
Ted Hendricks Award	Isaiah Buggs	DE	SR
Ted Hendricks Award	Raekwon Davis	DE	JR
Earl Campbell Tyler Rose Award	Jalen Hurts	QB	JR

=== SEC media poll ===
The SEC media poll was released on July 20, 2018, with the Crimson Tide predicted to win the West Division and the SEC.

=== Preseason All-SEC teams ===
The Crimson Tide had 13 players at 14 positions selected to the preseason all-SEC teams.

Offense

1st team

Damien Harris – RB

Jonah Williams – OL

Ross Pierschbacher – C

2nd team

Lester Cotton – OL

3rd team

Jerry Jeudy – WR

Matt Womack – OL

Defense

1st team

Raekwon Davis – DL

Anfernee Jennings – LB

Mack Wilson – LB

Deionte Thompson – DB

2nd team

Isaiah Buggs – DL

3rd team

Dylan Moses – LB

Specialists

2nd team

Trevon Diggs – all purpose player

3rd team

Trevon Diggs – RET

== Spring game ==
The 2018 Crimson Tide had spring practice from April 2018. The 2018 Alabama football spring game, "A-Day" took place in Tuscaloosa, AL on April 21, at 1 p.m. CST.

== Schedule ==
Alabama announced its 2018 football schedule on September 19, 2017. The 2018 Crimson Tide schedule consisted of 7 home and 4 away games for the regular season. Alabama hosted four SEC conference opponents Texas A&M, Missouri, Mississippi State (rivalry) and arch-rival Auburn for the 125th annual Iron Bowl to close out the regular season and traveled for four SEC opponents to Ole Miss (rivalry), Arkansas, Tennessee (Third Saturday of October) and closed out on the road at LSU (rivalry). Alabama did not play SEC East opponents Florida, Georgia, Kentucky, South Carolina and Vanderbilt in the 2018 regular season. The Crimson Tide's bye week came during week 9 on October 27.

Alabama's out of conference opponents represented the ACC, Southern and Sun Belt. The Crimson Tide hosted three non–conference games which were against Arkansas State and Louisiana of the Sun Belt and The Citadel of the SoCon and traveled to Orlando, FL for Camping World Kickoff host Louisville from the ACC.

Date	Time	Opponent	Rank	Site	TV	Result	Attendance
September 1	7:00 p.m.	vs. Louisville*	No. 1	Camping World Stadium; Orlando, FL (Camping World Kickoff)	ABC	W 51–14	57,280
September 8	2:30 p.m.	Arkansas State*	No. 1	Bryant–Denny Stadium; Tuscaloosa, AL	ESPN2	W 57–7	100,495
September 15	6:00 p.m.	at Ole Miss	No. 1	Vaught–Hemingway Stadium; Oxford, MS (rivalry, SEC Nation)	ESPN	W 62–7	62,919
September 22	2:30 p.m.	No. 22 Texas A&M	No. 1	Bryant–Denny Stadium; Tuscaloosa, AL (SEC Nation)	CBS	W 45–23	101,821
September 29	11:00 a.m.	Louisiana*	No. 1	Bryant–Denny Stadium; Tuscaloosa, AL	SECN	W 56–14	101,471
October 6	11:00 a.m.	at Arkansas	No. 1	Donald W. Reynolds Razorback Stadium; Fayetteville, AR	ESPN	W 65–31	64,974
October 13	6:00 p.m.	Missouri^{†}	No. 1	Bryant–Denny Stadium; Tuscaloosa, AL	ESPN	W 39–10	101,821
October 20	2:30 p.m.	at Tennessee	No. 1	Neyland Stadium; Knoxville, TN (Third Saturday in October, SEC Nation)	CBS	W 58–21	97,087
November 3	7:00 p.m.	at No. 3 LSU	No. 1	Tiger Stadium; Baton Rouge, LA (rivalry, College GameDay)	CBS	W 29–0	102,321
November 10	2:30 p.m.	No. 16 Mississippi State	No. 1	Bryant–Denny Stadium; Tuscaloosa, AL (rivalry)	CBS	W 24–0	101,821
November 17	11:00 a.m.	The Citadel*	No. 1	Bryant–Denny Stadium; Tuscaloosa, AL	SECN	W 50–17	101,681
November 24	2:30 p.m.	Auburn	No. 1	Bryant–Denny Stadium; Tuscaloosa, AL (Iron Bowl, SEC Nation)	CBS	W 52–21	101,821
December 1	3:00 p.m.	vs. No. 4 Georgia	No. 1	Mercedes-Benz Stadium; Atlanta, GA (SEC Championship Game, College GameDay, SEC Nation)	CBS	W 35–28	77,141
December 29	7:00 p.m.	vs. No. 4 Oklahoma*	No. 1	Hard Rock Stadium; Miami Gardens, FL (Orange Bowl–CFP Semifinal, SEC Nation)	ESPN	W 45–34	66,203
January 7, 2019	7:00 p.m.	vs. No. 2 Clemson*	No. 1	Levi's Stadium; Santa Clara, CA (CFP National Championship, rivalry College GameDay, SEC Nation)	ESPN	L 16–44	74,814
*Non-conference game; ^{†}Homecoming; Rankings from AP Poll and CFP Rankings after October 30 released prior to game; All times are in Central time

== Coaching staff ==
Name	Position	Consecutive season at Alabama in current position
Nick Saban	Head coach	12th
Dan Enos	Associate head coach/quarterbacks coach	1st
Mike Locksley	Offensive coordinator	3rd (1st as full-time OC)
Josh Gattis	Co-offensive coordinator/wide receivers coach	1st
Pete Golding	Co-defensive coordinator/inside linebackers coach	1st
Tosh Lupoi	Defensive coordinator/outside linebackers coach	4th (2nd as DC)
Jeff Banks	Special teams coordinator/tight end coach	1st
Craig Kuligowski	Associate head coach/defensive line coach	1st
Brent Key	Offensive line coach	3rd
Joe Pannunzio	Running backs coach	2nd
Karl Scott	Defensive backs coach	1st
Scott Cochran	Strength and conditioning	11th

Graduate Assistant

- Mike Miller
- Nick Perry
- Kyle Pope

Analysts

- Andy Kwon
- Isaac Shewmaker
- Alex Mortensen
- Javier Arenas
- Dean Altobelli
- Gordon Steele
- Butch Jones
- Brendan Farrell
- Jake Peetz
- August Mangin
- Mike Miller
- Lou Spanos
- Jake Long
- Rob Ezell

== Roster ==
2018 Alabama Crimson Tide Football
Quarterback: 2 Jalen Hurts – junior (6'2, 210); 7 Braxton Barker – freshman (6'1, 196); 10 Mac Jones – (redshirt) freshman (6'2, 180); 13 Tua Tagovailoa – sophomore (6'1, 215); 16 Kyle Edwards – (redshirt) sophomore (6'1, 206); 18 Layne Hatcher – freshman (6'0, 196); Running back: 5 Ronnie Clark – (redshirt) senior (6'2, 217); 8 Josh Jacobs – junior (5'10, 200); 22 Najee Harris – sophomore (6'3, 226); 24 Brian Robinson Jr. – sophomore (6'1, 224); 27 Jerome Ford – freshman (5'11, 206); 34 Damien Harris – senior (5'11, 214); 35 De'Marquise Lockridge – senior (5'11, 196); Wide receiver: 4 Jerry Jeudy – sophomore (6'1, 175); 6 DeVonta Smith – sophomore (6'1, 160); 9 Xavier Williams – freshman (6'1, 182); 11 Henry Ruggs – sophomore (6'0, 175); 12 Chadarius Townsend – (redshirt) freshman (6'0, 192); 14 Tyrell Shavers – (redshirt) freshman (6'6, 202); 17 Jaylen Waddle – freshman (5'10, 177); 18 Slade Bolden – Freshman (5'11, 200); 19 Xavian Marks – senior (5'8, 163); 30 Chris Herring – junior (6'4, 170); 31 Bryce Musso – sophomore (5'9, 168); 32 Jalen Jackson – senior (6'3, 184); 36 Mac Hereford – (redshirt) sophomore (6'2, 215); 37 Dalton Adkison – freshman (6'0, 180); 81 Derek Kief – (redshirt) junior (6'4, 200); 83 John Parker – senior (6'0, 187); 85 Chris Golden – sophomore (6'5, 197); 86 Connor Adams – senior (6'1, 194); Placekicker: 29 Austin Jones – senior (5'10, 215); 97 Joseph Bulovas – (redshirt) freshman (6'0, 205); Punter: 12 Skyler DeLong – freshman (6'4, 189); 98 Mike Bernier – (redshirt) junior (6'2, 205); 98 Preston Knight – (redshirt) sophomore (6'5, 200)	Tight end: 40 Giles Amos – (redshirt) junior (6'4, 236); 43 Daniel Powell – (redshirt) junior (5'11, 238); 44 Kedrick James – (redshirt) freshman (6'5, 245); 80 Michael Parker – freshman (6'6, 224); 82 Irv Smith Jr. – junior (6'4, 235); 84 Hale Hentges – senior (6'5, 256); 87 Miller Forristall – (redshirt) sophomore (6'5, 220); 88 Major Tennison – sophomore (6'5, 244); Offensive lineman: 50 Hunter Brannon – (redshirt) freshman (6'4, 290); 55 Emil Ekiyor Jr. – freshman (6'3, 342); 60 Kendall Randolph – sophomore (6'5, 285); 61 Alex Pearman – freshman (6'1, 258); 62 Jackson Roby – freshman (6'5, 267); 65 Deonte Brown – (redshirt) sophomore (6'4, 350); 66 Lester Cotton – senior (6'4, 319); 67 Josh Casher – (redshirt) senior (6'1, 284); 70 Alex Leatherwood – sophomore (6'6, 327); 71 Ross Pierschbacher – (redshirt) senior (6'4, 304); 72 Richie Petitbon – (redshirt) junior (6'4, 300); 73 Jonah Williams – junior (6'5, 280); 74 Jedrick Wills – sophomore (6'5, 315); 75 Tommy Brown – freshman (6'7, 309); 76 Scott Lashley – (redshirt) sophomore (6'7, 325); 77 Matt Womack – (redshirt) junior (6'7, 320); 78 Elliot Baker – senior (6'7, 297); 79 Chris Owens – (redshirt) sophomore (6'3, 307); Defensive lineman: 48 Phidarian Mathis – (redshirt) freshman (6'4, 287); 49 Isaiah Buggs – senior (6'5, 292); 58 Christian Barmore – freshman (6'5, 292); 68 Galen Richardson – sophomore (6'3, 296); 89 LaBryan Ray – sophomore (6'5, 275); 90 Stephon Wynn Jr. – freshman (6'4, 299); 91 Tevita Musika – junior (6'1, 338); 92 Quinnen Williams – (redshirt) sophomore (6'4, 265); 95 Johnny Dwight – (redshirt) senior (6'3, 306); 96 Taylor Wilson – (redshirt) junior (6'0, 274); 98 Quindarius Watkins – sophomore (6'4, 229); 99 Raekwon Davis – junior (6'7, 325)	Linebacker: 1 Ben Davis – (redshirt) sophomore (6'4, 240); 4 Christopher Allen – sophomore (6'5, 234); 9 Eyabi Anoma – freshman (6'5, 245); 10 Ale Kaho – freshman (6'1", 218); 16 Jamey Mosley – (redshirt) senior (6'5, 226); 20 Cameron Latu– freshman (6'5", 246); 23 Jarez Parks – (redshirt) freshman (6'4, 251); 24 Terrell Lewis – junior (6'5, 245); 30 Mack Wilson – junior (6'2, 240); 32 Dylan Moses – sophomore (6'3, 234); 33 Anfernee Jennings – (redshirt) junior (6'3, 268); 36 Markail Benton – (redshirt) freshman (6'2, 237); 40 Joshua McMillon – (redshirt) junior (6'3, 245); 42 Jaylen Moody – freshman (6'2, 227); 44 Cole Weaver – sophomore (5'9, 214); 47 Christian Miller – (redshirt) senior (6'4, 230); 55 Wes Baumhower – freshman (6'0, 220); 54 Trae Drake – sophomore (5'10, 221); 55 William Cooper – sophomore (6'2, 234); 56 Preston Malone – sophomore (5'11, 226); 57 Joe Donald – junior (6'3, 216); Defensive back: 2 Patrick Surtain II – freshman (6'2, 202); 3 Daniel Wright – sophomore (6'1, 185); 4 Saivion Smith – junior (6'1, 200); 5 Shyheim Carter – junior (6'0, 190); 7 Trevon Diggs – junior (6'2, 185); 13 Nigel Knott – (redshirt) sophomore (5'11, 190); 14 Deionte Thompson – (redshirt) junior (6'2, 190); 15 Xavier McKinney – sophomore (6'1, 192); 21 Jared Mayden – junior (6'0, 198); 22 Jalyn Armour-Davis – freshman (6'1, 181); 25 Eddie Smith – freshman (6'0, 184); 26 Kyriq McDonald – (redshirt) freshman (5'11, 194); 28 Josh Jobe – freshman (6'1, 191); 31 Keaton Anderson – (redshirt) junior (6'1, 215); 34 Brandon Bishop – freshman (6'0, 197); 35 D.J. Lewis – senior (5'11, 196); 37 Donavan Mosley – (redshirt) senior (5'10, 185); 38 Sean Kelly – junior (5'11, 191); Long snappers: 45 Thomas Fletcher – (redshirt) freshman (6'2, 220); 52 Scott Meyer – (redshirt) sophomore (6'2, 226); 53 Ryan Parris – (redshirt) senior (6'0, 209); 78 Ryan McDougal – (redshirt) senior (5'10, 275)
2018 Alabama Crimson Tide Football Commits (08/05/2018)

=== Depth chart ===
Defense

FS
Xavier McKinney
Shyheim Carter
Jared Mayden

JACK	MIKE	WILL	SAM
Anfernee Jennings	Mack Wilson	Dylan Moses	Christian Miller
Jamey Mosley	Josh McMillon	Ale Kaho	Eyabi Anoma
Cameron Latu	Markail Benton	⋅	⋅

SS
Deionte Thompson
Daniel Wright
Keaton Anderson

CB
Saivion Smith
Jalyn Armour-Davis
⋅

DE	NT	DE
Raekwon Davis	Quinnen Williams	Isaiah Buggs
Johnny Dwight	Phidarian Mathis	LaBryan Ray
⋅	⋅	⋅

CB
Patrick Surtain II
Josh Jobe
⋅

Offense

WR
Jerry Jeudy
Jaylen Waddle
Chadarius Townsend

WR
DeVonta Smith
Tyrell Shavers
⋅

LT	LG	C	RG	RT
Jonah Williams	Lester Cotton	Ross Pierschbacher	Alex Leatherwood	Jedrick Wills
Scott Lashley	Josh Casher	Chris Owens	Deonte Brown	Richie Petitbon
⋅	⋅	Emil Ekiyor Jr.	⋅	⋅

TE
Irv Smith Jr.
Hale Hentges
Miller Forristall

WR
Henry Ruggs
Derek Kief
Xavian Marks

QB
Tua Tagovailoa
Jalen Hurts
Mac Jones

Special teams
PK Joseph Bulovas
P Mike Bernier
KR Josh Jacobs
Brian Robinson Jr.
PR Jaylen Waddle
LS Thomas Fletcher
H Mac Jones

RB
Damien Harris
Josh Jacobs
Najee Harris

== Game summaries ==
=== vs. Louisville ===
Camping World Kickoff

Team	1	2	3	4	Total
Louisville	0	0	7	7	14
• #1 Alabama	14	14	16	7	51

- Date: September 1
- Location: Orlando, FL
- Game start: 8:14 p.m.
- Game attendance: 57,280
- Game weather: 91, Partly Cloudy, Wind E @ 12 mph
- Referee: Jerry McGinn
- TV announcers (ABC): Chris Fowler (play-by-play), Kirk Herbstreit (color), Maria Taylor (sideline)

Scoring summary
Q1	11:55	ALA	Jerry Jeudy 11 Yd pass from Tua Tagovailoa (Austin Jones Kick) 7 plays, 65 yards, 3:05	7–0
Q1	4:04	ALA	Tua Tagovailoa 9 Yd Run (Austin Jones Kick) 6 plays, 55 yards, 2:00	14–0
Q2	11:24	ALA	Najee Harris 1 Yd Run (Austin Jones Kick) 6 plays, 75 yards, 2:52	21–0
Q2	0:09	ALA	Jerry Jeudy 25 Yd pass from Tua Tagovailoa (Austin Jones Kick) 3 plays, 25 yards, 0:18	28–0
Q3	10:03	ALA	Josh Jacobs 18 Yd Run (Austin Jones PAT failed) 4 plays, 63 yards, 1:07	34–0
Q3	6:27	LOU	Kemari Averett 12 Yd pass from Jawon Pass (Blanton Creque Kick) 10 plays, 75 yards, 3:36	34–7
Q3	6:16	ALA	Josh Jacobs 77 Yd Kickoff Return (Austin Jones Kick) 0 plays, 0 yards, 0:11	41–7
Q3	0:45	ALA	Austin Jones 39 Yd Field Goal 6 plays, 37 yards, 3:16	44–7
Q4	7:31	ALA	Shyheim Carter 45 Yd Interception Return (Austin Jones Kick) 1 play, 0 yards, 0:13	51–7
Q4	1:55	LOU	Kemari Averett 8 Yd pass from Jawon Pass (Blanton Creque Kick) 5 plays, 52 yards, 1:44	51–14

Statistics

Statistics	Louisville	Alabama
First downs	19	21
Total yards	268	519
Rushing yards	16	222
Passing yards	252	297
Turnovers	2	1
Time of possession	28:51	31:09

Team	Category	Player	Statistics
Louisville	Passing	Jawon Pass	20/39, 252 yards, 2 TD, 2 INT
Louisville	Rushing	Trey Smith	4 carries, 11 yards
Louisville	Receiving	Seth Dawkins	3 receptions, 68 yards
Alabama	Passing	Tua Tagovailoa	12/16, 227 yards, 2 TD
Alabama	Rushing	Damien Harris	7 carries, 55 yards
Alabama	Receiving	DeVonta Smith	4 receptions, 99 yards

=== vs. Arkansas State ===
Team	1	2	3	4	Total
Arkansas State	0	0	7	0	7
• #1 Alabama	19	21	10	7	57

- Date: September 8
- Location: Tuscaloosa, AL
- Game start: 2:35 p.m.
- Game attendance: 100,495
- Game weather: 89, Partly Cloudy, Hot, Wind SSW @ 7mph
- Referee: Marc Curles
- TV announcers (ESPN2): Kevin Brown (play-by-play), Andre Ware (color), Alex Corddry (sideline)

Scoring summary
Q1	13:19	ALA	Jerry Jeudy 58 Yd pass from Tua Tagovailoa (Austin Jones Kick) 5 plays, 75 yards, 1:41	7–0
Q1	11:30	ALA	Henry Ruggs 31 Yd pass from Tua Tagovailoa (Austin Jones PAT failed) 2 plays, 31 yards, 0:12	13–0
Q1	3:00	ALA	DeVonta Smith 41 Yd pass from Tua Tagovailoa (Austin Jones PAT failed) 7 plays, 70 yards, 2:44	19–0
Q2	8:52	ALA	Irv Smith Jr. 10 Yd pass from Jalen Hurts (Joseph Bulovas Kick) 7 plays, 63 yards, 2:40	26–0
Q2	7:43	ALA	Jerry Jeudy 7 Yd pass from Jalen Hurts (Joseph Bulovas Kick) 3 plays, 52 yards, 0:42	33–0
Q2	6:44	ALA	Saivion Smith 38 Yd Interception Return (Joseph Bulovas Kick) 2 plays, 15 yards, 0:59	40–0
Q3	12:28	ARKST	Kendrick Edwards 23 Yd pass from Justice Hansen (Sawyer Williams Kick) 8 plays, 75 yards, 2:32	40–7
Q3	9:46	ALA	Joseph Bulovas 39 Yd Field Goal 6 plays, 23 yards, 2:42	43–7
Q3	1:30	ALA	Derek Kief 14 Yd pass from Tua Tagovailoa (Joseph Bulovas Kick) 15 plays, 89 yards, 7:01	50–7
Q4	12:06	ALA	Najee Harris 1 Yd Run (Joseph Bulovas Kick) 9 plays, 75 yards, 3:34	57–7

Statistics

Statistics	Arkansas State	Alabama
First downs	19	26
Total yards	391	599
Rushes–yards	173	278
Passing yards	218	321
Passing: Comp–Att–Int	22–51–1	20–29–0
Time of possession	28:16	31:44

Team	Category	Player	Statistics
Arkansas State	Passing	Justice Hansen	15–36, 140 yards, 1 TD, 1 INT
Arkansas State	Rushing	Warren Wand	11 carries, 60 yards
Arkansas State	Receiving	Omar Bayless	3 receptions, 36 yards
Alabama	Passing	Tua Tagovailoa	13–19, 228 yards, 4 TD
Alabama	Rushing	Najee Harris	13 carries, 135 yards, 1 TD
Alabama	Receiving	Jerry Jeudy	4 receptions, 87 yards, 2 TDs

=== At Ole Miss ===
Team	1	2	3	4	Total
• #1 Alabama	28	21	10	3	62
Ole Miss	7	0	0	0	7

- Date: September 15
- Location: Oxford, MS
- Game start: 6:08 p.m.
- Game attendance: 62,919
- Game weather: 92 degrees
- Referee: Hubert Owens
- TV announcers (ESPN): Sean McDonough (play-by-play), Todd Blackledge (color) and Holly Rowe (Sideline)

Scoring summary
Q1	14:49	MISS	D.K. Metcalf 75 Yd pass from Jordan Ta’amu (Luke Logan Kick) 1 plays, 75 yards, 0:11	7–0
Q1	13:39	ALA	Damien Harris 43 yrd run (Joseph Bulovas kick) 3 plays, 72 yards, 0:59	7–7
Q1	9:51	ALA	Jerry Jeudy 79 Yd pass from Tua Tagovailoa (Joseph Bulovas kick) 3 plays, 80 yards, 0:59	14–7
Q1	5:43	ALA	Najee Harris 10 Yd run (Joseph Bulovas Kick) 6 plays, 62 yards, 2:25	21–7
Q1	4:40	ALA	Irv Smith Jr. 12 Yd pass from Tua Tagovailoa (Joseph Bulovas Kick) 3 plays, 15 yards, 0:50	28–7
Q2	7:18	ALA	Josh Jacobs 4 Yd run (Joseph Bulovas Kick) 3 plays, 30 yards, 0:54	35–7
Q2	4:36	ALA	Jerry Jeudy 22 Yd pass from Jalen Hurts (Joseph Bulovas Kick) 3 plays, 30 yards, 0:54	42–7
Q2	00:55	ALA	Henry Ruggs III 13 yrd pass from Jalen Hurts (Joseph Bulovas Kick) 8 plays, 75 yards, 2:32	49–7
Q3	11:49	ALA	Joseph Bulovas 20 yrd field goal, 6 plays, 23 yards, 2:42	52–7
Q3	5:04	ALA	Xavier McKinney 30 yrd interception return (Joseph Bulovas Kick) 15 plays, 89 yards, 7:01	59–7
Q4	12:16	ALA	Joseph Bulovas 44 yrd field goal, 9 plays, 75 yards, 3:34	62–7

Statistics

Statistics	Alabama	Ole Miss
First downs	27	9
Total yards	516	248
Rushes–yards	210	115
Passing yards	306	133
Passing: Comp–Att–Int	19–28–0	7–22–2
Time of possession	34:20	25:40

Team	Category	Player	Statistics
Alabama	Passing	Tua Tagovailoa	11/15, 191 yards, 2 TDs
Alabama	Rushing	Damien Harris	5 carries, 62 yards, 1 TD
Alabama	Receiving	Jerry Jeudy	3 receptions, 136 yards, 2 TDs
Ole Miss	Passing	Jordan Ta'amu	7/22, 133 yards, 1 TD, 2 INTs
Ole Miss	Rushing	Scottie Phillips	12 carries, 44 yards
Ole Miss	Receiving	DK Metcalf	2 receptions, 92 yards, 1 TD

=== vs. Texas A&M ===
Team	1	2	3	4	Total
#22 Texas A&M	7	6	3	7	23
• #1 Alabama	14	17	14	0	45

- Date: September 22
- Location: Tuscaloosa, AL
- Game start: 2:40 p.m.
- Game attendance: 101,821
- Game weather: 86, Partly Sunny, Wind SE @ 8 mph
- Referee: Matt Loeffler
- TV announcers (CBS): Brad Nessler (play-by-play), Gary Danielson (color), Jamie Erdahl (sideline)

Scoring summary
Q1	14:10	ALA	DeVonta Smith 30 Yd pass from Tua Tagovailoa (Joseph Bulovas Kick) 1 play, 30 yards, 0:08	7–0
Q1	4:55	TAMU	Jace Strenberger 15 Yd pass from Kellen Mond (Seth Small kick) 2 plays, 31 yards, 4:15	7–7
Q1	0:45	ALA	Tua Tagovailoa 1 yrd run (Joseph Bulovas kick) 10 plays, 60 yards, 4:10	14–7
Q2	8:56	TAMU	Seth Small 52 yrd field goal, 4 plays, 37 yards, 2:05	14–10
Q2	6:50	ALA	Hale Hentges 23 Yd pass from Tua Tagovailoa (Joseph Bulovas Kick) 7 plays, 75 yards, 2:00	21–10
Q2	3:24	TAMU	Seth Small 32 yrd field goal, 7 plays, 60 yards, 3:21	21–13
Q2	1:09	ALA	Hale Hentges 6 Yd pass from Tua Tagovailoa (Joseph Bulovas Kick) 7 plays, 80 yards, 2:15	28–13
Q2	0:00	ALA	Joseph Bulovas 47 yrd field goal, 3 plays, 17 yards, 0:50	31–13
Q3	10:03	ALA	Josh Jacobs 3 yrd run (Joseph Bulovas kick), 7 plays, 80 yards, 1:29	38–13
Q3	5:33	TAMU	Seth Small 25 yrd field goal, 10 plays, 67 yards, 4:30	38–16
Q3	2:01	ALA	Henry Ruggs III 57 yrd pass from Tua Tagovailoa (Joseph Bulovas Kick), 2 plays, 92 yards, 0:29	45–16
Q4	7:36	TAMU	Kellen Mond 9 yrd run (Seth Small kick), 11 plays, 88 yards, 5:26	45–23

Statistics

Statistics	Texas A&M	Alabama
First downs	22	24
Total yards	393	564
Rushes–yards	130	109
Passing yards	263	415
Passing: Comp–Att–Int	23–44–2	25–33–0
Time of possession	32:36	27:24

Team	Category	Player	Statistics
Texas A&M	Passing	Kellen Mond	16/33, 196 yards, 1 TD, 2 INTs
Texas A&M	Rushing	Kellen Mond	18 carries, 98 yards, 1 TD
Texas A&M	Receiving	Jace Sternberger	3 receptions, 59 yards, 1 TD
Alabama	Passing	Tua Tagovailoa	22/30, 387 yards, 4 TDs
Alabama	Rushing	Damien Harris	7 carries, 52 yards
Alabama	Receiving	Henry Ruggs	3 receptions, 89 yards, 1 TD

=== vs. Louisiana ===
Team	1	2	3	4	Total
Louisiana	0	0	0	14	14
• #1 Alabama	28	21	7	0	56

- Date: September 29
- Location: Tuscaloosa, AL
- Game start: 11:01 a.m.
- Game attendance: 101,471
- Game weather: 75, Clear, Sunny, Wind N @ 2 mph
- Referee: Hubert Owens
- TV announcers (SECN): Taylor Zarzour (play-by-play), Matt Stinchcomb (color), Kris Budden (sideline)

Scoring summary
Q1
Q2
Q3
Q4

Statistics

Statistics	Louisiana	Alabama
First downs	15	26
Total yards	288	608
Rushes–yards	200	268
Passing yards	88	340
Passing: Comp–Att–Int	11–20–2	13–16–0
Time of possession	29:56	30:04

Team	Category	Player	Statistics
Louisiana	Passing	Andre Nunez	9/15, 75 yards, 1 TD, 2 INT
Louisiana	Rushing	Trey Ragas	16 carries, 111 yards, 1 TD
Louisiana	Receiving	Ja'Marcus Bradley	3 receptions, 24 yards, 1 TD
Alabama	Passing	Tua Tagovailoa	8/8, 128 yards, 2 TD
Alabama	Rushing	Najee Harris	11 carries, 73 yards, 1 TD
Alabama	Receiving	Jaylen Waddle	3 receptions, 138 yards, 2 TD

=== At Arkansas ===
Team	1	2	3	4	Total
• #1 Alabama	21	20	7	17	65
Arkansas	7	7	3	14	31

- Date: October 6
- Location: Fayetteville, AR
- Game start: 11:02 a.m.
- Game attendance: 64,974
- Game weather: 78, Mostly Cloudy, Wind S @ 13 mph
- Referee: John McDaid
- TV announcers (ESPN): Dave Pasch (play-by-play), Greg McElroy (color), Tom Luginbill (sideline)

Scoring summary
Q1
Q2
Q3
Q4

Statistics

Statistics	Alabama	Arkansas
First downs	24	22
Total yards	639	405
Rushes–yards	246	172
Passing yards	393	233
Passing: Comp–Att–Int	14–18–0	26–40–1
Time of possession	27:04	32:56

Team	Category	Player	Statistics
Alabama	Passing	Tua Tagovailoa	10–13, 334 yards, 4 TD
Alabama	Rushing	Damien Harris	15 carries, 111 yards, 2 TD
Alabama	Receiving	Jerry Jeudy	4 receptions, 135 yards, 2 TD
Arkansas	Passing	Ty Storey	25–39, 230 yards, 2 TD, 1 INT
Arkansas	Rushing	Rakeem Boyd	15 carries, 106 yards
Arkansas	Receiving	Deon Stewart	2 receptions, 53 yards

=== vs. Missouri ===
Team	1	2	3	4	Total
Missouri	10	0	0	0	10
• #1 Alabama	13	17	2	7	39

- Date: October 13
- Location: Tuscaloosa, AL
- Game start: 6:10 p.m.
- Game attendance: 101,821
- Game weather: 74, Partly Cloudy, Wind W @ 4 mph
- Referee: Ken Williamson
- TV announcers (ESPN): Steve Levy (play-by-play), Brian Griese (color), Todd McShay (sideline)

Scoring summary
Q1
Q2
Q3
Q4

Statistics

Statistics	Missouri	Alabama
First downs	13	25
Total yards	212	564
Rushes–yards	70	184
Passing yards	142	380
Passing: Comp–Att–Int	13–26	19–30
Time of possession	27:43	32:17

Team	Category	Player	Statistics
Missouri	Passing	Drew Lock	13/26, 142 yards, 1 TD, 2 INT
Missouri	Rushing	Larry Rountree III	17 carries, 48 yards
Missouri	Receiving	Jalen Knox	3 receptions, 61 yards, 1 TD
Alabama	Passing	Tua Tagovailoa	12/22, 265 yards, 3 TD
Alabama	Rushing	Damien Harris	14 carries, 62 yards, 1 TD
Alabama	Receiving	Jerry Jeudy	3 receptions, 147 yards, 1 TD

=== At Tennessee ===
Third Saturday in October

Team	1	2	3	4	Total
• #1 Alabama	28	14	16	0	58
Tennessee	0	14	7	0	21

- Date: October 20
- Location: Knoxville, TN
- Game start: 3:39 p.m.
- Game attendance: 97,087
- Game weather: 64, Mostly Cloudy, Wind W @ 10 mph
- Referee: Matt Loeffler
- TV announcers (CBS): Brad Nessler (play-by-play), Gary Danielson (color), Jamie Erdahl (sideline)

Scoring summary
Q1
Q2
Q3
Q4

Statistics

Statistics	Alabama	Tennessee
First downs	30	13
Total yards	545	258
Rushes–yards	42–218	30–31
Passing yards	327	227
Passing: Comp–Att–Int	21–32–1	14–25–0
Time of possession	32:33	27:27

Team	Category	Player	Statistics
Alabama	Passing	Tua Tagovailoa	19–29, 306 yards, 4 TD
Alabama	Rushing	Josh Jacobs	12 carries, 68 yards, 2 TD
Alabama	Receiving	Jaylen Waddle	4 receptions, 117 yards, 1 TD
Tennessee	Passing	Keller Chryst	9–15, 164 yards, 2 TD
Tennessee	Rushing	Tim Jordan	14 carries, 53 yards
Tennessee	Receiving	Jauan Jennings	6 receptions, 102 yards

=== At LSU ===
Team	1	2	3	4	Total
• #1 Alabama	6	10	6	7	29
#4 LSU	0	0	0	0	0

- Date: November 3
- Location: Baton Rouge, LA
- Game start: 7:10 p.m.
- Game attendance: 102,321
- Game weather: 65, Clear, Wind ESE @ 6 mph
- Referee: Matt Austin
- TV announcers (CBS): Brad Nessler (play-by-play), Gary Danielson (color), Jamie Erdahl (sideline)

Scoring summary
Q1
Q2
Q3
Q4

Statistics

Statistics	Alabama	LSU
First downs	29	13
Total yards	576	196
Rushes–yards	37–281	25–12
Passing yards	295	184
Passing: Comp–Att–Int	25–42–1	18–35–1
Time of possession	35:18	24:42

Team	Category	Player	Statistics
Alabama	Passing	Tua Tagovailoa	25–42, 295 yards, 2 TD's, 1 INT
Alabama	Rushing	Damien Harris	19 carries, 107 yards, 1 TD
Alabama	Receiving	Jerry Jeudy	8 receptions, 103 yards
LSU	Passing	Joe Burrow	18–35, 184 yards, 1 INT
LSU	Rushing	Clyde Edwards-Helaire	6 carries, 14 yards
LSU	Receiving	Justin Jefferson	6 receptions, 81 yards

=== vs. Mississippi State ===
Team	1	2	3	4	Total
#18 Mississippi State	0	0	0	0	0
• #1 Alabama	14	7	0	3	24

- Date: November 10
- Location: Tuscaloosa, AL
- Game start: 2:50 p.m.
- Game attendance: 101,821
- Game weather: 50, Clear, Sunny, Wind N @ 9 mph
- Referee: Ken Williamson
- TV announcers (CBS): Brad Nessler (play-by-play), Gary Danielson (color), Jamie Erdahl (sideline)

Scoring summary
Q1
Q2
Q3
Q4

Statistics

Statistics	Mississippi State	Alabama
First downs	6	23
Total yards	169	305
Rushes–yards	30–44	45–142
Passing yards	125	163
Passing: Comp–Att–Int	11–20–0	17–27–1
Time of possession	26:05	33:55

Team	Category	Player	Statistics
Mississippi State	Passing	Nick Fitzgerald	11–20, 125 yards
Mississippi State	Rushing	Kylin Hill	7 carries, 47 yards
Mississippi State	Receiving	Deddrick Thomas	2 receptions, 25 yards
Alabama	Passing	Tua Tagovailoa	14–21, 164 yards, 1 TD, 1 INT
Alabama	Rushing	Josh Jacobs	20 carries, 97 yards, 1 TD
Alabama	Receiving	Jerry Jeudy	6 receptions, 45 yards

=== vs. The Citadel ===
Team	1	2	3	4	Total
The Citadel	0	10	0	7	17
• #1 Alabama	7	3	27	13	50

- Date: November 17
- Location: Tuscaloosa, AL
- Game start: 11:01 a.m.
- Game attendance: 101,681
- Game weather: 58, Sunny
- Referee: Lee Hedrick
- TV announcers (SEC Network): Dave Neal (play-by-play), D.J. Shockley (color), Dawn Davenport (sideline)

Scoring summary
Q1
Q2
Q3
Q4

Statistics

Statistics	The Citadel	Alabama
First downs	13	21
Total yards	275	561
Rushes–yards	60–275	23–190
Passing yards	0	371
Passing: Comp–Att–Int	0–2–0	21–26–0
Time of possession	36:23	21:29

Team	Category	Player	Statistics
The Citadel	Passing	Brandon Rainey	0–2, 0 yards
The Citadel	Rushing	Dante Smith	9 carries, 130 yards, 2 TD's
The Citadel	Receiving	none	none
Alabama	Passing	Tua Tagovailoa	18–22, 340 yards, 3 TD's
Alabama	Rushing	Damien Harris	7 carries, 83 yards
Alabama	Receiving	Henry Ruggs	6 receptions, 114 yards

=== vs. Auburn ===
Iron Bowl

Team	1	2	3	4	Total
Auburn	7	7	7	0	21
• #1 Alabama	7	10	21	14	52

- Date: November 24
- Location: Tuscaloosa, AL
- Game start: 2:39 p.m.
- Game attendance: 101,821
- Game weather: 60, Partly Sunny, Wind SW @ 4 mph
- Referee: Hubert Owens
- TV announcers (CBS): Brad Nessler (play-by-play), Gary Danielson (color), Jamie Erdahl (sideline)

Scoring summary
Q1
Q2
Q3
Q4

Statistics

Statistics	Auburn	Alabama
First downs	19	23
Total yards	283	500
Rushes–yards	43–130	26–123
Passing yards	153	377
Passing: Comp–Att–Int	15–32–1	26–33–0
Time of possession	34:37	25:23

Team	Category	Player	Statistics
Auburn	Passing	Jarrett Stidham	13–30, 127 yards, 1 TD, 1 INT
Auburn	Rushing	JaTarvious Whitlow	19 carries, 61 yards
Auburn	Receiving	Ryan Davis	4 receptions, 15 yards
Alabama	Passing	Tua Tagovailoa	25–32, 324 yards, 5 TD's
Alabama	Rushing	Damien Harris	9 carries, 41 yards
Alabama	Receiving	Jerry Jeudy	5 receptions, 77 yards, 1 TD

=== vs. Georgia (SEC Championship Game) ===
SEC Championship Game

Team	1	2	3	4	Total
• #1 Alabama	0	14	7	14	35
#4 Georgia	7	14	7	0	28

- Date: December 1
- Location: Atlanta, GA
- Game start: 4:11 p.m.
- Game attendance: 77,141
- Game weather: Indoors
- Referee: Matt Loeffler
- TV announcers (CBS): Brad Nessler (play-by-play), Gary Danielson (color), Jamie Erdahl (sideline)

Scoring summary
Q1
Q2
Q3
Q4

Statistics

Statistics	Alabama	Georgia
First downs	21	23
Total yards	403	454
Rushes–yards	29–157	39–153
Passing yards	246	301
Passing: Comp–Att–Int	17–34–2	25–40–0
Time of possession	24:30	35:30

Team	Category	Player	Statistics
Alabama	Passing	Tua Tagovailoa	10–25, 164 yards, 1 TD, 2 INT's
Alabama	Rushing	Josh Jacobs	8 carries, 83 yards, 2 TD's
Alabama	Receiving	Jaylen Waddle	4 receptions, 113 yards, 1 TD
Georgia	Passing	Jake Fromm	25–39, 301 yards, 3 TD's
Georgia	Rushing	D'Andre Swift	16 carries, 75 yards, 1 TD
Georgia	Receiving	Isaac Nauta	4 receptions, 81 yards, 1 TD

=== vs. Oklahoma (Orange Bowl–CFP Semifinal) ===
Capital One Orange Bowl (Semifinal)

Team	1	2	3	4	Total
#4 Oklahoma	0	10	10	14	34
• #1 Alabama	21	10	0	14	45

- Date: December 29
- Location: Miami Gardens, FL
- Game start: 8:10 p.m.
- Game attendance: 66,203
- Game weather: 75, Cloudy, Wind SE @ 3 mph
- Referee: Duane Heydt
- TV announcers (ESPN): Chris Fowler (play-by-play), Kirk Herbstreit (color), Maria Taylor and Laura Rutledge (sideline)

Scoring summary
Q1
Q2
Q3
Q4

Statistics

Statistics	Oklahoma	Alabama
First downs	26	28
Total yards	471	528
Rushes–yards	32–163	42–200
Passing yards	308	328
Passing: Comp–Att–Int	19–37–0	25–28–0
Time of possession	23:52	36:08

Team	Category	Player	Statistics
Oklahoma	Passing	Kyler Murray	19–37, 308 yards, 2 TD's
Oklahoma	Rushing	Kyler Murray	17 carries, 109 yards, 1 TD
Oklahoma	Receiving	CeeDee Lamb	8 receptions, 109 yards, 1 TD
Alabama	Passing	Tua Tagovailoa	24–27, 318 yards, 4 TD's
Alabama	Rushing	Josh Jacobs	15 carries, 98 yards
Alabama	Receiving	DeVonta Smith	6 receptions, 104 yards, 1 TD

=== vs. Clemson (National Championship) ===
CFP National Championship

Team	1	2	3	4	Total
• #2 Clemson	14	17	13	0	44
#1 Alabama	13	3	0	0	16

- Date: January 7, 2019
- Location: Santa Clara, CA
- Game start: 5:17 p.m.
- Game attendance: 74,814
- Game weather: 61, Cloudy, Wind SE & 5–10 mph
- Referee: Mike Cannon
- TV announcers (ESPN): Chris Fowler (play-by-play), Kirk Herbstreit (color), Maria Taylor and Tom Rinaldi (sideline)

Scoring summary
Q1
Q2
Q3
Q4

Statistics

Statistics	Clemson	Alabama
First downs	21	23
Total yards	482	443
Rushes–yards	31–135	37–148
Passing yards	347	295
Passing: Comp–Att–Int	20–32–0	22–36–2
Time of possession	28:23	31:37

Team	Category	Player	Statistics
Clemson	Passing	Trevor Lawrence	20–32, 347 yards, 3 TD's
Clemson	Rushing	Travis Etienne	14 carries, 86 yards, 2 TD's
Clemson	Receiving	Justyn Ross	6 receptions, 153 yards, 1 TD
Alabama	Passing	Tua Tagovailoa	22–34, 295 yards, 2 TD's, 2 INT's
Alabama	Rushing	Najee Harris	9 carries, 59 yards
Alabama	Receiving	Jerry Jeudy	5 receptions, 139 yards, 1 TD

== Rankings ==
In-season polls

Ranking movements Legend: ██ Increase in ranking ██ Decrease in ranking ( ) = First-place votes
	Week															
Poll	Pre	1	2	3	4	5	6	7	8	9	10	11	12	13	14	Final
AP	1 (42)	1 (48)	1 (54)	1 (58)	1 (60)	1 (58)	1 (59)	1 (60)	1 (61)	1 (60)	1 (60)	1 (61)	1 (61)	1 (61)	1 (61)	2
Coaches	1 (61)	1 (59)	1 (59)	1 (60)	1 (61)	1 (61)	1 (61)	1 (61)	1 (60)	1 (62)	1 (63)	1 (64)	1 (63)	1 (63)	1 (62)	2
CFP	Not released									1	1	1	1	1	1	Not released

== Statistics ==
=== Team ===
Team Statistics
	Alabama	Opponents
Points	215	51
First Downs	74	47
Rushing	21	7
Passing	23	25
Penalty	14	21
Rushing Yards	519	243
Rushing Attempts	86	57
Average Per Rush	5.8	3.3
Long		
Rushing TDs	4	0
Passing yards	618	470
Comp–Att	37–55	42–90
Comp %	67.27	46.66
Average Per Game	309.00	235.00
Average per Attempt	11.24	5.22
Passing TDs	8	3
INT's	0	3
Rating		
Touchdowns	15	3
Passing	8	3
Rushing	4	0
Defensive	2	0
Interceptions	3	0
Yards		
Long		
Total Offense	1118	659
Total Plays	141	147
Average Per Yards/Game	559	329.5
Kick Returns: # – Yards	1–77	10–196
TDs	1	0
Long	77	
Punts	7	16
Yards	249	665
Average	35.57	41.56
Punt Returns: # – Yards	6–74	0–0
TDs	0	0
Long		
Fumbles – Fumbles Lost	3–2	0–0
Opposing TD's		
Penalties – Yards	14–146	21–177
3rd–Down Conversion %	66.67	24.24
4th–Down Conversion %	NaN	40.00
Takeaways	3	2
Field Goals	2–3	0–1
Extra Point		
Sacks	6	2
Sack Against		
Yards	23	13

=== Offense ===
Passing Statistics
#	NAME	POS	RAT	CMP	ATT	YDS	CMP%	TD	INT
13	Tua Tagovailoa	QB	199.4	245	355	3966	69.0	43	6
2	Jalen Hurts	QB	196.7	51	70	765	72.9	8	2
10	Mac Jones	QB	143.32	8	13	123	38.46	1	0
	Totals		205.69	301	438	4854	68.73	52	8

Rushing Statistics
#	NAME	POS	CAR	YDS	LONG	TD	YPC
22	Najee Harris	HB	117	783	32	4	6.7
34	Damien Harris	HB	150	876	73	9	5.8
8	Josh Jacobs	HB	120	640	59	11	5.3
24	Brian Robinson Jr.	HB	63	272	20	2	4.3
13	Tua Tagovailoa	QB	57	190	44	5	3.3
2	Jalen Hurts	QB	36	167	27	2	4.6
	TOTALS		571	2,976	73	33	5.2

Receiving Statistics
#	NAME	POS	REC	YDS	LONG	TD	AVG
6	DeVonta Smith	WR	42	693	57	6	16.5
4	Jerry Jeudy	WR	68	1315	81	14	19.3
82	Irv Smith Jr.	TE	44	710	76	7	16.1
17	Jaylen Waddle	WR	45	848	94	7	18.8
11	Henry Ruggs lll	WR	46	741	57	11	16.1
34	Damien Harris	RB	22	204	52	0	9.3
	TOTALS		190	3,410	94	34	17.95

=== Defense ===
Key: POS: Position, SOLO: Solo Tackles, AST: Assisted Tackles, TOT: Total Tackles, TFL: Tackles-for-loss, SACK: Quarterback Sacks, INT: Interceptions, PD: Passes Defended, FF: Forced Fumbles, FR: Fumbles Recovered, BLK: Kicks or Punts Blocked, SAF: Safeties

Defensive Statistics
#	NAME	POS	SOLO	AST	TOT	TFL	SACKS	INT-YDS	PD	FR	FF		
	TOTAL		0	0	0	0 – 0	0	0	0	0	0	0	0
	OPPONENTS		0	0	0	0	0	0	0	0	0	0	0

Interceptions Statistics
#	NAME	POS	INT	YDS	AVG	TD	LNG
4	Saivion Smith	CB	3	71	23.7	1	38
14	Deionte Thompson	S	2	65	32.5	0	40
15	Xavier McKinney	S	2	23	11.5	1	30
30	Mack Wilson	LB	2	0	0.0	0	0
5	Shyheim Carter	CB	2	89	44.5	2	45
33	Anfernee Jennings	LB	1	8	8.0	0	8
2	Patrick Surtain II	CB	1	20	20.0	0	20
7	Trevon Diggs	CB	1	0	0.0	0	0
	TOTALS		14	276	19.7	4	45

Kick return statistics
#	NAME	POS	RTNS	YDS	AVG	TD	LNG
8	Josh Jacobs	RB	14	428	30.6	1	77
24	Brian Robinson Jr.	RB	5	84	16.8	0	30
87	Miller Forristall	TE	2	5	2.5	0	4
82	Irv Smith Jr.	TE	1	6	6.0	0	6
	TOTALS		22	523	23.8	1	77

Punting statistics
#	NAME	POS	PUNTS	YDS	AVG	LONG
98	Mike Bernier	P	25	951	38.0	55
12	Skyler Delong	P	16	551	34.4	51
	TOTALS		41	1,502	36.6	55

Punt return statistics
#	NAME	POS	RTNS	YDS	AVG	TD	LONG
17	Jaylen Waddle	WR/KR	16	233	14.6	1	63
81	Derek Kief	WR/KR	1	17	17.0	0	17
	TOTALS		17	250	14.7	1	63

Scores by quarter (non-conference opponents)

	1	2	3	4	Total
All opponents	0	10	14	28	52
Alabama	68	59	60	27	214

Scores by quarter (SEC opponents)

	1	2	3	4	Total
SEC opponents	45	48	27	21	141
Alabama	131	130	83	65	409

Scores by quarter (All opponents)

	1	2	3	4	Total
All opponents	45	58	41	49	193
Alabama	199	189	143	92	623

== Awards and honors ==
=== Weekly awards ===
- Quinnen Williams

(2) SEC Defensive Lineman Player of the Weeks (Week 1 vs Louisville), (Week 11 vs Mississippi State)
SEC Defensive Player of the Week (Week 10 vs LSU)

- Jaylen Waddle

SEC Freshman Player of the Week (Week 1 vs Louisville)

- Christian Miller

SEC Defensive Player of the Week (Week 3 vs Ole Miss)

- Tua Tagovailoa (4)

SEC Offensive Player of the Week (Week 4 vs Texas A&M), (Week 8 vs Tennessee), (Week 13 vs Auburn)

- Ross Pierschbacher

SEC Offensive Lineman Player of the Week (Week 6 vs Arkansas)

- Jedrick Wills

SEC Offensive Lineman Player of the Week (Week 7 vs Missouri)

- Jonah Williams

SEC Offensive Lineman Player of the Week (Week 10 vs LSU)

- Isaiah Buggs

SEC Defensive Lineman Player of the Week (Week 4 vs Texas A&M)

=== Individual awards ===
- Jonah Williams – Jacobs Blocking Trophy
- Jaylen Waddle – SEC Freshman Player of the Year
- Tua Tagovailoa – SEC Offensive Player of the Year, SN Player of the Year, Walter Camp Award, Maxwell Award, Polynesian College Football Player of the Year
- Hale Hentges – SEC Scholar Athlete Player of the Year
- Quinnen Williams – Bill Willis Award, Outland Trophy
- Jerry Jeudy – Fred Biletnikoff Award
- Mike Locksley, OC – Broyles Award
- Nick Saban, HC – Walter Camp Coach of the Year

=== All-Americans ===
- Jerry Jeudy – AP First Team, Walter Camp First Team, Sporting News First Team, AFCA First Team, ESPN All-America
- Jonah Williams – AP First Team, Walter Camp First Team, Sporting News First Team, FWAA First Team, AFCA First Team, ESPN All-America
- Quinnen Williams – AP First Team, Walter Camp First Team, Sporting News First Team, FWAA First Team, AFCA First Team, ESPN All-America
- Deionte Thompson – AP Second Team, Sporting News First Team, AFCA First Team, ESPN All-America
- Tua Tagovailoa – AP Second Team, Walter Camp First Team, Sporting News First Team, FWAA Second Team, AFCA First Team
- Ross Pierschbacher – AP Second Team, Sporting News First Team
- Keaton anderson – COSIDA Academic All-America Second Team
- Dylan Moses – Walter Camp Second Team
- Isaiah Buggs – AFCA Second Team
- Irv Smith Jr. – AFCA Second Team
- Mack Wilson – AFCA Second Team
- Patrick Surtain II – AP Freshman All-America, USA Today Freshman All-America
- Jaylen Waddle – AP Freshman All-America, USA Today Freshman All-America

=== All-SEC Teams ===
1st Team

- Tua Tagovailoa, Quarterback (AP-1, Coaches-1)
- Jerry Jeudy, Wide Receiver (AP-1, Coaches-1)
- Ross Pierschbacher, Center (AP-1, Coaches-2)
- Jonah Williams, Offensive Tackle (AP-1, Coaches-1)
- Quinnen Williams, Defensive tackle (AP-1, Coaches-1)
- Deionte Thompson, Safety (Coaches-1)

2nd Team

- Damien Harris, Running Back (Coaches-2)
- Alex Leatherwood, Offensive Tackle (Coaches-2)
- Irv Smith Jr., Tight End (AP-2)
- Isaiah Buggs, Defensive End (AP-2, Coaches-2)
- Raekwon Davis, Defensive End (Media-2)
- Dylan Moses, Linebacker (Coaches-2)
- Mack Wilson, Linebacker (Coaches-2)
- Deionte Thompson, Safety (AP-2)

=== Postseason ===
==== Reese's Senior Bowl ====
- Christian Miller, Linebacker
- Isaiah Buggs, Defensive lineman

== Players drafted into the NFL ==
Round	Pick	Player	Position	NFL Club
1	3	Quinnen Williams	DT	New York Jets
1	11	Jonah Williams	OT	Cincinnati Bengals
1	24	Josh Jacobs	RB	Oakland Raiders
2	50	Irv Smith Jr.	TE	Minnesota Vikings
3	87	Damien Harris	RB	New England Patriots
4	115	Christian Miller	LB	Carolina Panthers
5	139	Deionte Thompson	S	Arizona Cardinals
5	153	Ross Pierschbacher	C	Washington Redskins
5	155	Mack Wilson	LB	Cleveland Browns
6	192	Isaiah Buggs	DT	Pittsburgh Steelers

== Media Affiliates ==
=== TV ===
- CBS Family – CBS 42 (CBS), CBS Sports Network
- ESPN/ABC Family – ABC 33/40 (ABC), ABC, ESPN, ESPN2, ESPNU, ESPN+, SEC Network)
