= 2018 All-SEC football team =

American college football all-star team

The 2018 All-SEC football team consists of American football players selected to the All-Southeastern Conference (SEC) chosen by the Associated Press (AP) and the conference coaches for the 2018 Southeastern Conference football season.

Alabama won the conference, beating Georgia 35–28 in the SEC Championship.

Alabama quarterback Tua Tagovailoa was voted the AP SEC Offensive Player of the Year. Kentucky linebacker Josh Allen was voted the AP SEC Defensive Player of the Year.

== Offensive selections ==
=== Quarterbacks ===
- Tua Tagovailoa, Alabama (AP-1, Coaches-1)
- Drew Lock, Missouri (AP-2, Coaches-2)

=== Running backs ===
- Benny Snell, Kentucky (AP-1, Coaches-1)
- Trayveon Williams, Texas A&M (AP-1, Coaches-1)
- D'Andre Swift, Georgia (AP-2, Coaches-2)
- Damien Harris, Alabama (Coaches-2)
- Ke'Shawn Vaughn, Vanderbilt (AP-2)

=== Wide receivers ===
- A. J. Brown, Ole Miss (AP-1, Coaches-1)
- Jerry Jeudy, Alabama (AP-1, Coaches-1)
- Deebo Samuel, South Carolina (AP-2, Coaches-2)
- Emanuel Hall, Missouri (Coaches-2)
- Kalija Lipscomb, Vanderbilt (AP-2)

=== Centers ===
- Lamont Gaillard, Georgia (AP-2, Coaches-1)
- Ross Pierschbacher, Alabama (AP-1, Coaches-2)

=== Guards ===
- Bunchy Stallings, Kentucky (AP-1, Coaches-1)
- Tre'Vour Wallace-Simms, Missouri (AP-1)
- Zack Bailey, South Carolina (AP-2, Coaches-2)
- Hjalte Froholdt, Arkansas (AP-2)
- Shaq Calhoun, Miss St (Coaches-2)

=== Tackles ===
- Greg Little, Ole Miss (AP-1, Coaches-1)
- Jonah Williams, Alabama (AP-1, Coaches-1)
- Andrew Thomas, Georgia (AP-2, Coaches-1)
- Martez Ivey, Florida (AP-2, Coaches-2)
- Alex Leatherwood, Alabama (Coaches-2)

=== Tight ends ===
- Jace Sternberger, Texas A&M (AP-1, Coaches-1)
- Irv Smith Jr., Alabama (AP-2)
- Jared Pinkney, Vanderbilt (Coaches-2)

== Defensive selections ==
=== Defensive ends ===
- Jachai Polite, Florida (AP-1, Coaches-1)
- Montez Sweat, Miss St (AP-1, Coaches-1)
- Isaiah Buggs, Alabama (AP-2, Coaches-2)
- Raekwon Davis, Alabama (AP-2)
- Jonathan Ledbetter, Georgia (Coaches-2)

=== Defensive tackles ===
- Jeffery Simmons, Miss St (AP-1, Coaches-1)
- Quinnen Williams, Alabama (AP-1, Coaches-1)
- Derrick Brown, Auburn (AP-2, Coaches-2)
- Terry Beckner Jr., Missouri (AP-2, Coaches-2)

=== Linebackers ===
- Josh Allen, Kentucky (AP-1, Coaches-1)
- Deshaun Davis, Auburn (AP-1, Coaches-1)
- Devin White, LSU (AP-1, Coaches-1)
- Cale Garrett, Missouri (Coaches-2)
- De'Jon Harris, Arkansas (AP-2)
- Dylan Moses, Alabama (Coaches-2)
- Erroll Thompson, Miss St (AP-2)
- D'Andre Walker, Georgia (AP-2)
- Mack Wilson, Alabama (Coaches-2)

=== Cornerbacks ===
- Deandre Baker, Georgia (AP-1, Coaches-1)
- Greedy Williams, LSU (AP-1, Coaches-1)
- Cameron Dantzler, Miss St (AP-2)
- Joejuan Williams, Vanderbilt (AP-2, Coaches-2)
- C. J. Henderson, Florida (Coaches-2)

=== Safeties ===
- Grant Delpit, LSU (AP-1, Coaches-1)
- Johnathan Abram, Miss St (AP-1, Coaches-2)
- Mike Edwards, Kentucky (AP-2)
- Deionte Thompson, Alabama (AP-2, Coaches-1)
- DeMarkus Acy, Missouri (Coaches-2)

== Special teams ==
=== Kickers ===
- Cole Tracy, LSU (AP-1, Coaches-1)
- Rodrigo Blankenship, Georgia (AP-2, Coaches-2)

=== Punters ===
- Braden Mann, Texas A&M (AP-1, Coaches-1)
- Zach Von Rosenberg, LSU (AP-2)
- Joseph Charlton, South Carolina (Coaches-2)

=== All purpose/return specialist ===
- Deebo Samuel, South Carolina (AP-1, Coaches-1)
- Mecole Hardman, Georgia (AP-2)
- Lynn Bowden, Kentucky (Coaches-2)

== Key ==
Bold = Consensus first-team selection by both the coaches and AP

AP = Associated Press

Coaches = Selected by the SEC coaches

== See also ==
- 2018 Southeastern Conference football season
- 2018 College Football All-America Team
