= Dylan Moses =

American football player (born 1998)

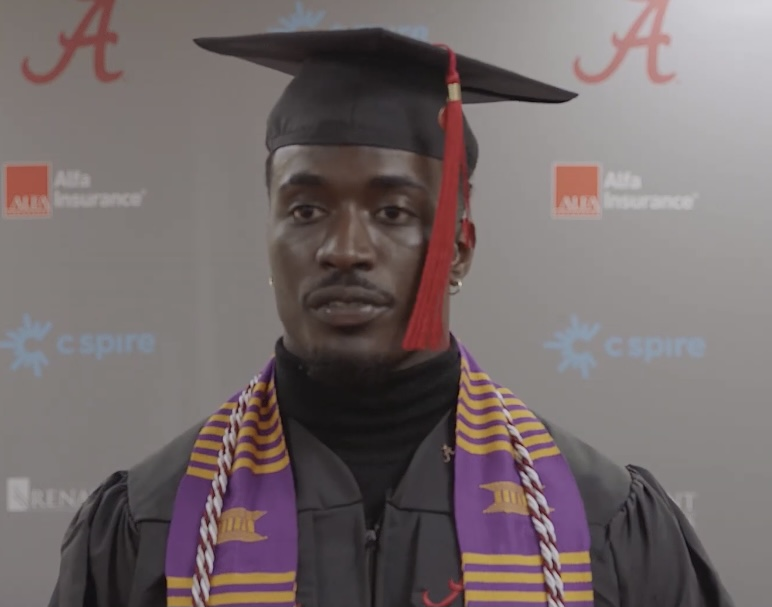
- Moses in 2020

Profile
- Position: Linebacker

Personal information
- Born: May 25, 1998 (age 28); Baton Rouge, Louisiana, U.S.
- Listed height: 6 ft 3 in (1.91 m)
- Listed weight: 240 lb (109 kg)

Career information
- High school: IMG Academy (Bradenton, Florida)
- College: Alabama (2017–2020)
- NFL draft: 2021: undrafted

Career history
- Jacksonville Jaguars (2021)*; Memphis Showboats (2024)*; Winnipeg Blue Bombers (2024)*
- * Offseason or practice squad member only

Awards and highlights
- USA Today All-American (2016); High School Butkus Award (2016); 2× CFP national champion (2017, 2020); Second-team All-American (2018); Third-team All-American (2020); First-team All-SEC (2020); Second-team All-SEC (2018)
- Stats at Pro Football Reference

Dylan Moses (born May 25, 1998) is an American former professional football linebacker. He played college football for the Alabama Crimson Tide and signed with the Jacksonville Jaguars as an undrafted free agent in 2021.

== Early life ==
Moses originally attended University High School in Baton Rouge, Louisiana, before transferring to IMG Academy in Bradenton, Florida, for his senior season. As a senior, he was the Parade Magazine National Player of the Year and won the Butkus Award. A five star recruit, Moses originally committed to Louisiana State University (LSU) to play college football before changing to the University of Alabama.

== College career ==
=== Freshman ===
As a true freshman at Alabama in 2017, Moses played in 11 games with two starts and recorded 30 tackles, 1.5 sacks and one interception. He was named to the SEC All-Freshman team. He missed the 2018 Sugar Bowl and the 2018 College Football Playoff National Championship due to a broken foot.

=== Sophomore ===
In his sophomore season Moses became a full time starter for the Crimson Tide. Moses played in all 15 games and recorded 86 total tackles, 10 tackles for a loss, 3.5 sacks and 1 forced fumble. Moses was regarded as one of the best linebackers in college football and was named as a finalist for the Butkus Award. He was also named a Second-team All-SEC selection and Second-team All-American selection

=== Junior ===
On the eve of the 2019 season, Moses suffered a knee injury during training and missed the entire season. He announced that he would return to Alabama for his senior season.

=== Senior ===
After recovering from his knee injury, Moses again became a full time starter for the Crimson Tide. In his senior season, Moses played in 13 games recording 80 total tackles, 6.5 tackles for a loss, 1.5 sacks and 1 interception. For his play on the field, Moses was named as a first-team All-SEC selection and third-team All-American. After the end of the season Moses revealed he was playing on a partially torn meniscus, impacting his performances on the field.

=== College Statistics ===
College statistics
Season	GP	Tackles					Interceptions					Fumbles			
Season	GP	Solo	Ast	Cmb	TfL	Sck	Int	Yds	Avg	TD	PD	FF	FR	Yds	TD
2017	11	19	11	30	5.5	1.5	1	11	11	0	0	1	0	0	0
2018	15	45	41	86	10	3.5	0	0	0	0	1	1	0	0	0
2020	13	40	40	80	6.5	1.5	1	1	1	0	3	1	0	0	0
Career	39	104	92	196	22	6.5	2	12	6.0	0	4	3	0	0	0

== Professional career ==
=== Pre-draft ===
Once considered as one of the most promising linebacker prospects in college football. Moses' lingering knee issues—including his 2019 ACL tear and partial meniscus tear in 2020 affected his pre-draft stock immensely. Moses did not participate in Alabama's pro-day testing as he had undergone knee surgery to repair his torn meniscus and instead only attended personal interviews with NFL teams. Ultimately some teams took Moses off of their draft boards beceause some evaluators believed that he had lost some of his explosiveness and athletic ability.

Pre-draft measurables
Height	Weight	Arm length	Hand span	Broad jump
6 ft 1 1/4 in (1.86 m)	225 lb (102 kg)	31 7/8 in (0.81 m)	9 1/4 in (0.23 m)	10 ft 6 in (3.20 m)

=== Jacksonville Jaguars ===
On May 1, 2021, Moses signed with the Jacksonville Jaguars as an undrafted free agent. He was placed on the reserve/non-football injury list at the start of 2021 season. On April 11, 2022, Moses was released by the Jaguars.

=== Memphis Showboats ===
On November 1, 2023, Moses signed with the Memphis Showboats of the United States Football League (USFL). He was released on March 10, 2024.

=== Winnipeg Blue Bombers ===
On May 6, 2024, Moses signed with the Winnipeg Blue Bombers of the Canadian Football League (CFL). He was released on June 2.
