= Camping World Kickoff =

Opening-weekend college football game

- Stadium: Camping World Stadium
- Location: Orlando, Florida
- Operated: 2016–present

2023 matchup
- No. 8 Florida State, No. 5 LSU (45–24)

The Camping World Kickoff is an annual college football game played on the opening weekend of the college football season in Orlando, Florida at Camping World Stadium. The game, a collaboration between Florida Citrus Sports and ESPN Events, debuted in 2016 with a Labor Day game between Ole Miss and Florida State.

Camping World was announced as the event's title sponsor in May 2016.

The event has occurred irregularly with no games in 2017, 2020-2022, or since 2023.

== Game results ==
Season	Date	Winning team		Losing team		Attendance
2016	September 5	4 Florida State	45	11 Ole Miss	34	63,042
2018	September 1	1 Alabama	51	Louisville	14	57,280
2019	August 24	8 Florida	24	Miami (FL)	20	66,543
2023	September 3	8 Florida State	45	5 LSU	24	65,429

Rankings are from the AP Poll.

== Future games ==
Any future games are to be determined.

== Records ==
=== By team ===
Rank	Team	Apps	Record	Win %
1	Florida State	2	2–0	1.000
2	Alabama	1	1–0	1.000
2	Florida	1	1–0	1.000
4	Louisville	1	0–1	.000
4	LSU	1	0–1	.000
4	Miami (FL)	1	0–1	.000
4	Ole Miss	1	0–1	.000

=== By conference ===
Rank	Conference	Apps	Record	Win %
1	ACC	4	2–2	.500
1	SEC	4	2–2	.500
