= Tyrell Shavers =

American football player (born 1999)

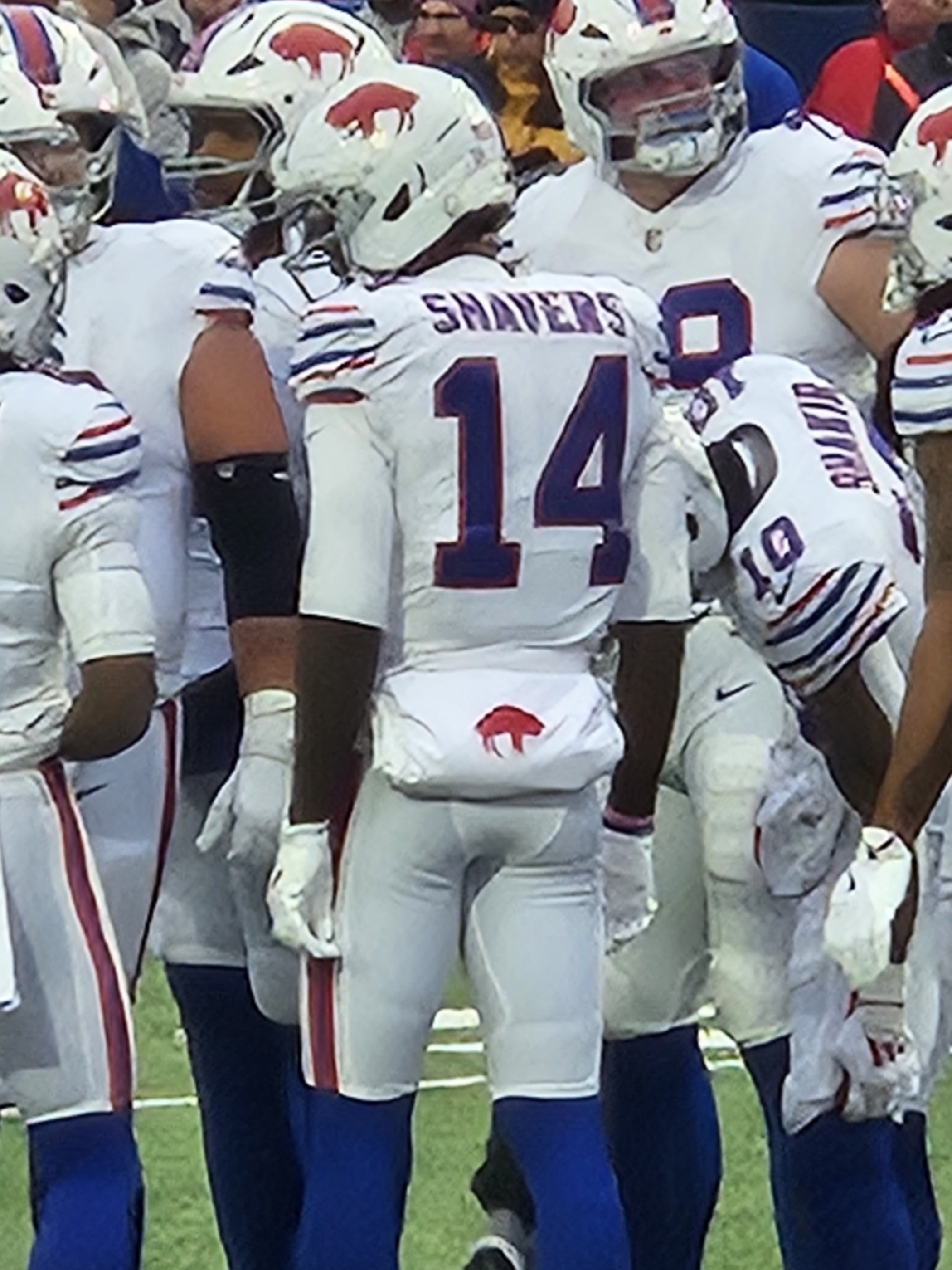
- Shavers (#14) with the Buffalo Bills in 2025

No. 14 – Buffalo Bills
- Position: Wide receiver
- Roster status: Active

Personal information
- Born: August 18, 1999 (age 27); Lewisville, Texas, U.S.
- Listed height: 6 ft 4 in (1.93 m)
- Listed weight: 211 lb (96 kg)

Career information
- High school: Lewisville
- College: Alabama (2017–2019); Mississippi State (2020); San Diego State (2021–2022)
- NFL draft: 2023: undrafted

Career history
- Buffalo Bills (2023–present)

Awards and highlights
- CFP national champion (2017); Second-team All-Mountain West (2022)

Career NFL statistics as of 2025
- Receptions: 16
- Receiving yards: 314
- Receiving touchdowns: 2
- Stats at Pro Football Reference

Tyrell Shavers (born August 18, 1999) is an American professional football wide receiver for the Buffalo Bills of the National Football League (NFL). He played college football for the Alabama Crimson Tide, Mississippi State Bulldogs, and San Diego State Aztecs.

== Early life ==
Shavers attended Lewisville High School in Lewisville, Texas. As a senior, he caught 37 passes for 702 yards and eight touchdowns and rushed for 43 yards. Shavers committed to play college football at the University of Alabama over other schools such as LSU, and Texas A&M.

== College career ==
=== Alabama ===
In his career at Alabama, Shavers played in 28 games after he redshirted his freshman season. In that span he only caught one pass for 20 yards and had one rushing attempt for 14 yards both coming in the 2019 season. Shavers' best play for Alabama was on special teams in 2019 when teammate Ale Kaho blocked a punt that Shavers recovered and returned for a touchdown against Texas A&M. After three seasons with the Crimson Tide, he entered the transfer portal.

=== Mississippi State ===
Shavers transferred to Mississippi State. He scored his first career offensive touchdown against #6 LSU, on a 31-yard pass from quarterback KJ Costello. The touchdown would be the first of Mississippi State's season and the first under new head coach Mike Leach. However midway through the season Shavers entered the transfer portal again. In his lone season with Mississippi State he brought in nine passes for 107 yards and one touchdown.

=== San Diego State ===
Shavers transferred to play for the San Diego State Aztecs. In his first year with the Aztecs he made 18 receptions for 213 yards and two touchdowns. In 2022, Shavers blocked a punt and returned it for a touchdown against Boise State to put the Aztecs up 13–0. Shavers finished the 2022 season with his best collegiate season after hauling in 38 passes for 643 yards and three touchdowns, earning second-team All-Mountain West honors. Shavers ended his career as a special teams ace for the Aztecs, tying the program career record with three blocked punts.

== Professional career ==
Pre-draft measurables
Height	Weight	Arm length	Hand span	Wingspan	40-yard dash	10-yard split	20-yard split	20-yard shuttle	Three-cone drill	Vertical jump	Broad jump	Bench press
6 ft 4 3/8 in (1.94 m)	211 lb (96 kg)	32 3/8 in (0.82 m)	9 3/4 in (0.25 m)	6 ft 6 1/4 in (1.99 m)	4.59 s	1.63 s	2.65 s	4.30 s	7.20 s	33.5 in (0.85 m)	9 ft 11 in (3.02 m)	3 reps
All values from Pro Day

After going unselected in the 2023 NFL draft, Shavers signed with the Buffalo Bills as an undrafted free agent. He was waived on August 29, 2023, and re-signed to the practice squad. Shavers signed a reserve/future contract with Buffalo on January 22, 2024.

Shavers was released by the Bills as part of final roster cuts on August 27, 2024, before being added back to the practice squad for the second year in a row. Shavers was called up from the practice squad for the Bills' Week 5 game against the Houston Texans. Shavers made his professional debut in that game, with 16 snaps on offense, but finished without a target in the Bills' 23–20 loss. Shavers was called up again for the Bills' Week 17 game against the New York Jets, where he took his first career target for a 69-yard touchdown off of a screen pass from Mitchell Trubisky in the fourth quarter. He signed a reserve/future contract with Buffalo on January 28, 2025.

Following the 2025 offseason, in which Shavers impressed local media writers and was repeatedly praised by other Bills players and staff, Shavers was selected to the Bills' initial 53-man roster for the first time in his career. After being sporadically targeted throughout the first half of the season, Shavers had a breakout game against the Tampa Bay Buccaneers, catching four passes for 90 yards and a touchdown, which came on a 43-yard pass from Josh Allen.

In the Wild Card Round against the Jacksonville Jaguars, Shavers suffered a torn ACL in the second quarter during a punt return. He would return to play 21 snaps on offense during the second half, despite the injury. The Bills subsequently placed Shavers on injured reserve, ending his season.

Shavers began the 2026 season on the PUP list due to his torn ACL. He was activated to the 53-man roster on November 18.

== NFL career statistics ==
Legend
**Bold**	Career high

=== Regular season ===
Year	Team	Games		Receiving						Fumbles	
Year	Team	GP	GS	Tgt	Rec	Yds	Avg	Lng	TD	Fum	Lost
2024	BUF	3	0	1	1	69	**69.0**	**69**	**1**	0	0
2025	BUF	17	9	**23**	**15**	**245**	16.3	43	**1**	0	0
2026	BUF	1	0	0	0	0	—	0	0	0	0
Career		21	9	24	16	314	19.6	69	2	0	0

=== Postseason ===
Year	Team	Games		Receiving						Fumbles	
Year	Team	GP	GS	Tgt	Rec	Yds	Avg	Lng	TD	Fum	Lost
2025	BUF	1	1	2	1	14	14.0	14	0	0	0
Career		1	1	2	1	14	14.0	14	0	0	0
