= Jonah Williams (offensive lineman) =

American football player (born 1997)

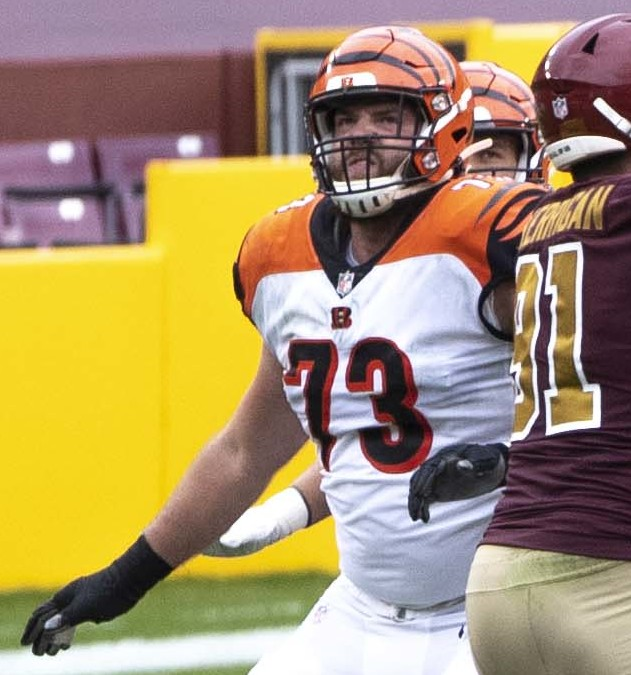
- Williams with the Cincinnati Bengals in 2020

Profile
- Position: Offensive tackle

Personal information
- Born: November 17, 1997 (age 28); Atlanta, Georgia, U.S.
- Listed height: 6 ft 5 in (1.96 m)
- Listed weight: 312 lb (142 kg)

Career information
- High school: Folsom (Folsom, California)
- College: Alabama (2016–2018)
- NFL draft: 2019: 1st round, 11th overall pick

Career history
- Cincinnati Bengals (2019–2023); Arizona Cardinals (2024–2025)

Awards and highlights
- Unanimous All-American (2018); Third-team All-American (2017); Jim Parker Trophy (2018); Jacobs Blocking Trophy (2018); CFP national champion (2017); 2× First-team All-SEC (2017, 2018); Second-team All-SEC (2016)

Career NFL statistics as of 2025
- Games played: 74
- Games started: 74
- Stats at Pro Football Reference

Jonah Williams (born November 17, 1997) is an American professional football offensive tackle. He played college football for the Alabama Crimson Tide and was selected by the Cincinnati Bengals in the first round of the 2019 NFL draft.

== Early life ==
Williams moved to California in ninth grade, after growing up in Atlanta. In Folsom, Williams was a four-star offensive tackle who committed to Alabama. He also received offers from Auburn, Arkansas, Florida, Georgia, Michigan and USC.

== College career ==
During his first season, Williams received the reputation as a "film junkie". Following the 2017 season, Williams was named a third-team All-American. On January 11, 2019, Williams announced that he would declare for the 2019 NFL draft.

== Professional career ==
Pre-draft measurables
Height	Weight	Arm length	Hand span	Wingspan	40-yard dash	10-yard split	20-yard split	20-yard shuttle	Three-cone drill	Vertical jump	Broad jump	Bench press	Wonderlic
6 ft 4 1/2 in (1.94 m)	302 lb (137 kg)	33 5/8 in (0.85 m)	10 1/8 in (0.26 m)	6 ft 9 3/4 in (2.08 m)	5.12 s	1.77 s	2.97 s	4.74 s	7.97 s	28.0 in (0.71 m)	8 ft 4 in (2.54 m)	23 reps	39
All values from NFL Combine/Pro Day

=== Cincinnati Bengals ===
Williams was selected by the Cincinnati Bengals in the first round (11th overall) of the 2019 NFL draft.

On June 25, 2019, it was revealed that Williams underwent left shoulder surgery to repair a torn labrum. Williams had suffered the injury while participating in organized team activities two weeks prior to the surgery. He was placed on the reserve/physically unable to perform list on August 31, 2019. He did not play during his rookie season.

Williams entered the 2020 season as the Bengals starting left tackle. He started 10 of 12 games, missing two games due to injury, before suffering a knee injury in Week 14. He was placed on injured reserve on December 9, 2020.

The Bengals picked up the fifth-year option on Williams' contract on April 29, 2022.

Following the Bengals signing left tackle Orlando Brown Jr., Williams requested a trade in March 2023. Williams chose to remain with the team, instead switching from left to right tackle.

=== Arizona Cardinals ===
On March 14, 2024, Williams signed a two-year contract with the Arizona Cardinals. He was named the starting right tackle in Week 1, but suffered a knee injury in the game and was placed on injured reserve on September 11. He was activated on November 20. During the Cardinals' Week 15 win over the New England Patriots on December 15, Williams recovered a fumble by Greg Dortch in the end zone for his first career touchdown.

Williams again operated as a starter in 2025, starting all nine of his appearances for Arizona. On November 21, 2025, it was announced that Williams would undergo season-ending surgery to repair a shoulder injury suffered in Week 10 against the Seattle Seahawks.

== NFL career statistics ==
Legend
**Bold**	Career high

=== Regular season ===
Year	Team	Games		Offense					
Year	Team	GP	GS	Snaps	Pct	Holding	False start	Decl/Pen	Acpt/Pen
2020	CIN	10	10	633	92%	**2**	0	0	2
2021	CIN	16	16	1,045	**100%**	**2**	**2**	0	5
2022	CIN	16	16	**1,101**	**100%**	**2**	**2**	0	**6**
2023	CIN	**17**	**17**	1,088	**100%**	**2**	1	**2**	3
Career		59	59	3,867	-	8	5	2	16
