= Ross Pierschbacher =

American football player (born 1995)

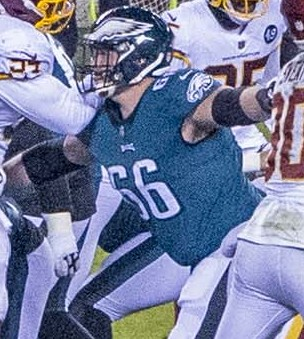
- Pierschbacher with the Philadelphia Eagles in 2021

No. 64, 66
- Position: Offensive guard

Personal information
- Born: June 5, 1995 (age 31); Cedar Falls, Iowa, U.S.
- Listed height: 6 ft 4 in (1.93 m)
- Listed weight: 310 lb (141 kg)

Career information
- High school: Cedar Falls
- College: Alabama (2014–2018)
- NFL draft: 2019: 5th round, 153rd overall pick

Career history
- Washington Redskins / Football Team (2019–2020); Philadelphia Eagles (2020); New York Jets (2021–2022)*; Detroit Lions (2022); Philadelphia Eagles (2023)*
- * Offseason or practice squad member only

Awards and highlights
- 2× CFP national champion (2015, 2017); 2× First-team All-SEC (2017, 2018); Second-team All-SEC (2016)

Career NFL statistics
- Games played: 11
- Stats at Pro Football Reference

Ross Pierschbacher (born June 5, 1995) is an American former professional football player who was an offensive guard in the National Football League (NFL). He played college football for the Alabama Crimson Tide and was selected by the Washington Redskins in the fifth round of the 2019 NFL draft.

== College career ==
Originally committing to the Iowa Hawkeyes, Pierschbacher changed his commitment to Alabama and enrolled in January 2014. He became a starter at guard as a redshirt freshman and stayed a starter for all four seasons, tallying 57 career starts and playing center as a senior. He was named an All-Southeastern Conference player in his last three seasons and team captain as a senior.

== Professional career ==
Pre-draft measurables
| Height | Weight | Arm length | Hand span | Wingspan | 40-yard dash | 10-yard split | 20-yard split | 20-yard shuttle | Three-cone drill | Vertical jump | Bench press |
|---|---|---|---|---|---|---|---|---|---|---|---|
| 6 ft 3 5/8 in (1.92 m) | 307 lb (139 kg) | 32 1/8 in (0.82 m) | 10 in (0.25 m) | 6 ft 7 3/4 in (2.03 m) | 5.20 s | 1.85 s | 3.06 s | 4.70 s | 7.83 s | 23.0 in (0.58 m) | 20 reps |
All values from NFL Combine/Pro Day

=== Washington Redskins / Washington Football Team ===
Pierschbacher was selected by the Washington Redskins in the fifth round (153rd overall) of the 2019 NFL draft. He was waived on September 5, 2020, and signed to their practice squad the next day. He was elevated to the active roster on November 7 for the team's Week 9 game against the New York Giants and reverted to the practice squad after the game.

=== Philadelphia Eagles (first stint) ===
On December 14, 2020, Pierschbacher was signed off Washington's practice squad by the Philadelphia Eagles.

On August 31, 2021, Pierschbacher was waived by the Eagles and re-signed to the practice squad the next day. He was released on September 9, 2021.

=== New York Jets ===
On September 10, 2021, Pierschbacher was signed to the New York Jets practice squad. He signed a reserve/future contract with the Jets on January 10, 2022. He was waived on August 30, 2022.

=== Detroit Lions ===
On September 8, 2022, Pierschbacher was signed to the Detroit Lions practice squad. He was promoted to the active roster on December 10. After appearing in three games for Detroit during the 2022 season, Pierschbacher re–signed with the Lions on March 8, 2023. He was waived/injured on August 13.

=== Philadelphia Eagles (second stint) ===
On November 13, 2023, Pierschbacher signed with the practice squad of the Eagles. He was released on December 7.
