= Hale Hentges =

American football player (born 1996)

No. 86, 88, 47, 87
- Position: Tight end

Personal information
- Born: August 19, 1996 (age 30); Jefferson City, Missouri, U.S.
- Listed height: 6 ft 4 in (1.93 m)
- Listed weight: 245 lb (111 kg)

Career information
- High school: Helias (Jefferson City)
- College: Alabama (2015-2018)
- NFL draft: 2019: undrafted

Career history
- Indianapolis Colts (2019); Washington Redskins / Football Team (2019–2020); Indianapolis Colts (2020)*; Minnesota Vikings (2020)
- * Offseason or practice squad member only

Career NFL statistics
- Receptions: 8
- Receiving yards: 103
- Receiving touchdowns: 1
- Stats at Pro Football Reference

Hale Hentges (born August 19, 1996) is an American former professional football player who was a tight end in the National Football League (NFL). He played college football for the Alabama Crimson Tide. He played in the NFL for the Indianapolis Colts, Washington Redskins / Football Team, and Minnesota Vikings.

== College career ==
A four-star recruit, Hentges committed to Alabama over offers from Auburn, Florida, Georgia, Iowa, LSU, Michigan, Ohio State, Oklahoma, Penn State, Texas, and Wisconsin, among many others. During his collegiate career, which lasted from 2015 to 2018, he had 15 receptions for 124 yards and 6 touchdowns. His main role and proficiency for Alabama was run blocking, helping Derrick Henry run for 2,219 yards and 22 touchdowns in 2015. Henry would go on to win the Heisman Trophy that year.

== Professional career ==
=== Indianapolis Colts ===
Hentges signed with the Indianapolis Colts as an undrafted free agent in 2019. After making the Colts initial 53-man roster, he was waived on October 5, 2019.

=== Washington Redskins / Football Team ===
On October 7, 2019, Hentges was claimed off waivers by the Washington Redskins. He caught his first and only career touchdown pass from Dwayne Haskins in Week 16 against the New York Giants. On September 5, 2020, Hentges was waived by Washington and signed to the practice squad the next day. He was released on September 17.

=== Indianapolis Colts (second stint) ===
On September 22, 2020, Hentges was signed to the Indianapolis Colts practice squad.

=== Minnesota Vikings ===
On December 10, 2020, Hentges was signed off the Colts' practice squad by the Minnesota Vikings. He announced his retirement from professional football on March 30, 2021.

== Personal life ==
On January 12, 2019, Hentges married former Alabama volleyball player Shannon Mikesky.
