= Christian Miller (American football) =

American football player (born 1996)

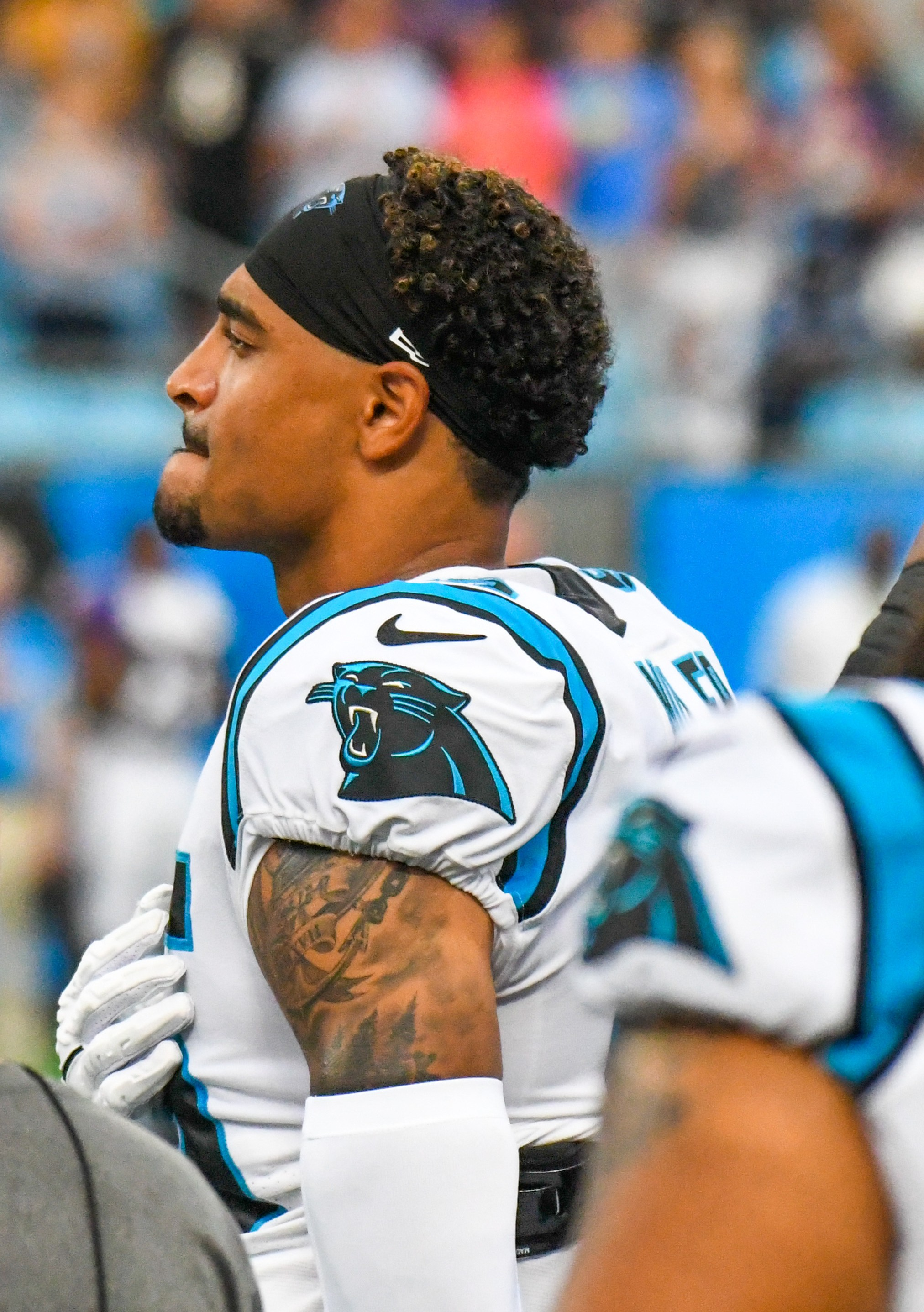
- Miller with the Carolina Panthers in 2021

No. 50, 55
- Position: Linebacker

Personal information
- Born: June 16, 1996 (age 30); Columbia, South Carolina, U.S.
- Listed height: 6 ft 3 in (1.91 m)
- Listed weight: 245 lb (111 kg)

Career information
- High school: Spring Valley (Columbia)
- College: Alabama (2014–2018)
- NFL draft: 2019: 4th round, 115th overall pick

Career history
- Carolina Panthers (2019–2021)

Career NFL statistics
- Total tackles: 3
- Sacks: 2
- Stats at Pro Football Reference

Christian Miller (born June 16, 1996) is an American former professional football player who was a linebacker for the Carolina Panthers of the National Football League (NFL). He played college football for the Alabama Crimson Tide.

== College career ==
Miller was a team captain and a member of 2 College Football Playoff National Championship teams as well as 4 Southeastern Conference (SEC) Championship teams while with the Crimson Tide. A four-star recruit and the top ranked player in the state of South Carolina heading into Alabama, Miller was primarily used as an outside linebacker in college, although coach Nick Saban sometimes experimented with him at inside linebacker in practice due to his versatility. Miller's junior season was widely hampered by injuries, but was highlighted with a sack in the 2017 College Football Playoff National Championship. In his senior season, Miller was a consistent threat off the edge recording 8.5 sacks. In week 3, Miller was named SEC Defensive Player of the Week after recording 2.5 sacks and 5 total tackles against the Ole Miss Rebels. Unfortunately, Miller strained his hamstring in the 2018 Orange Bowl and missed the 2019 College Football Playoff National Championship game due to the injury.

== Professional career ==
Pre-draft measurables
Height	Weight	Arm length	Hand span	Wingspan	20-yard shuttle	Three-cone drill	Vertical jump	Broad jump	Bench press
6 ft 3 3/8 in (1.91 m)	247 lb (112 kg)	35 1/8 in (0.89 m)	9 3/4 in (0.25 m)	6 ft 10 1/4 in (2.09 m)	4.49 s	7.43 s	38.5 in (0.98 m)	9 ft 10 in (3.00 m)	18 reps
All values from NFL Combine

At the 2019 NFL Scouting Combine, Miller recorded a 38.5-inch vertical jump and had the longest arm length measured for a linebacker at 35 1/8.

Miller was selected by the Carolina Panthers in the fourth round (115th overall) of the 2019 NFL draft. In week 3 against the Arizona Cardinals, Miller recorded his first 2 career sacks on fellow rookie Kyler Murray in the 38–20 win.

On August 31, 2021, Miller was waived by the Panthers.

== Personal life ==
Miller's father, Corey Miller, was a nine-year NFL veteran who spent time with the New York Giants and Minnesota Vikings. Miller now serves as a broadcaster and analyst covering the Alabama Crimson Tide and is the host of The Millers' Edge Radio Show.

On April 11, 2026, Miller's radio show, The Millers' Edge, was named Best Sports Talk Show (Alabama Medium Market) at the 20th Annual ABBY Awards, presented by the Alabama Broadcasters Association.
