= Isaiah Buggs =

American football player (born 1996)

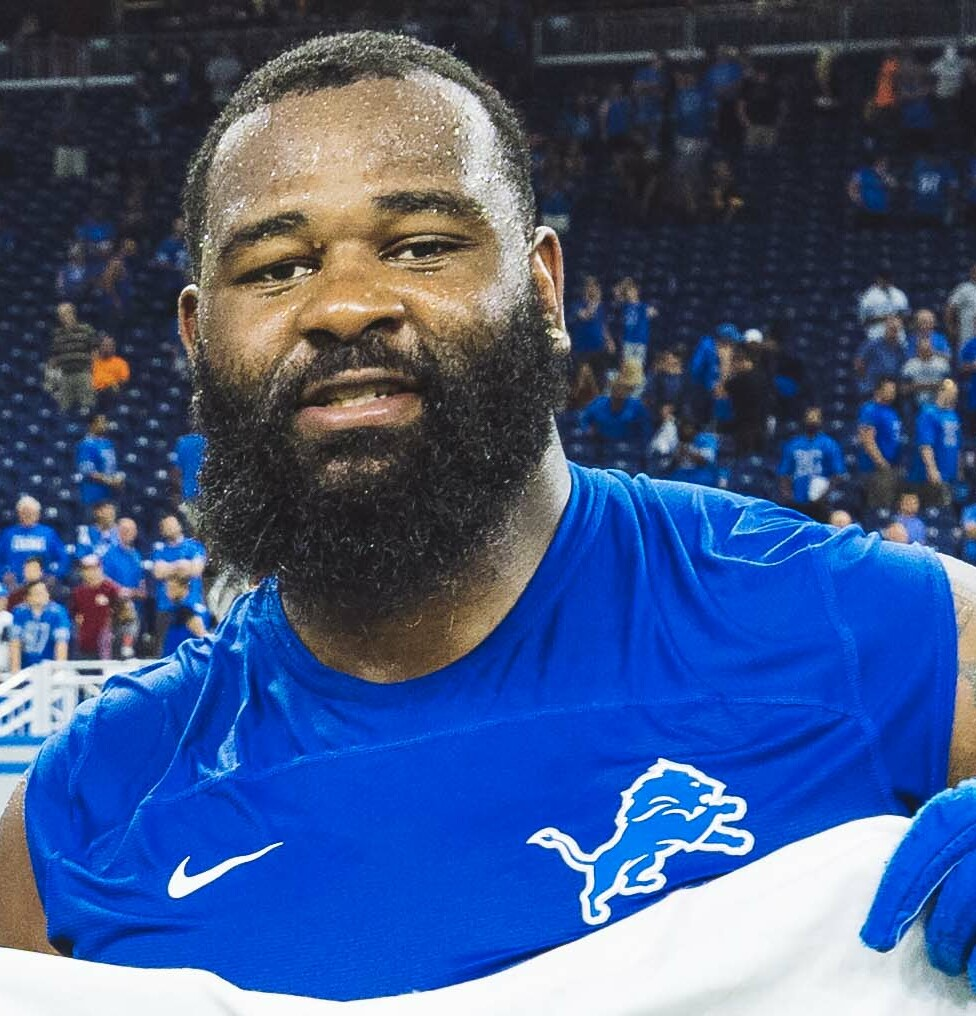
- Buggs with the Detroit Lions in 2022

No. 96 – Orlando Storm
- Position: Defensive tackle
- Roster status: Active

Personal information
- Born: August 24, 1996 (age 30); Ruston, Louisiana, U.S.
- Listed height: 6 ft 3 in (1.91 m)
- Listed weight: 299 lb (136 kg)

Career information
- High school: Ruston
- College: Mississippi Gulf Coast CC (2015–2016); Alabama (2017–2018)
- NFL draft: 2019: 6th round, 192nd overall pick

Career history
- Pittsburgh Steelers (2019–2021); Las Vegas Raiders (2021)*; Detroit Lions (2022–2023); Kansas City Chiefs (2023–2024)*; San Antonio Brahmas (2025); Orlando Storm (2026–present)
- * Offseason or practice squad member only

Awards and highlights
- Super Bowl champion (LVIII); CFP national champion (2017); All-UFL Team (2026); Second-team All-SEC (2018)

Career NFL statistics
- Total tackles: 89
- Sacks: 2
- Forced fumbles: 1
- Fumble recoveries: 1
- Pass deflections: 4
- Stats at Pro Football Reference

Isaiah Buggs (born August 24, 1996) is an American professional football defensive tackle for the Orlando Storm of the United Football League (UFL). He played college football at Alabama.

== Early life and college ==
Buggs attended and played high school football at Ruston High School in Ruston, Louisiana.

He played at Mississippi Gulf Coast Community College in 2015 and 2016. During the two years he had 134 tackles and 7.5 sacks. In 2017, he transferred to the University of Alabama. During his first year at Alabama in 2017, Buggs started 13 of 14 games, recording 51 tackles and 1.5 sacks. He had five tackles in the 2018 College Football Playoff National Championship victory over Georgia. He returned to Alabama in 2018.

== Professional career ==
Pre-draft measurables
Height	Weight	Arm length	Hand span	Wingspan	40-yard dash	10-yard split	20-yard split	20-yard shuttle	Three-cone drill	Vertical jump	Broad jump	Bench press
6 ft 3 1/8 in (1.91 m)	306 lb (139 kg)	31 1/4 in (0.79 m)	9 1/4 in (0.23 m)	6 ft 3 1/2 in (1.92 m)	5.15 s	1.82 s	3.01 s	4.83 s	8.01 s	24.5 in (0.62 m)	8 ft 0 in (2.44 m)	20 reps
All values from NFL Combine

=== Pittsburgh Steelers ===
Buggs was selected by the Pittsburgh Steelers in the sixth round (192nd overall) of the 2019 NFL draft. In his rookie season, he appeared in eight games and recorded three total tackles. He was placed on the reserve/COVID-19 list by the team on November 27, 2020, and activated three days later. He was released by the Steelers on January 8, 2022.

=== Las Vegas Raiders ===
On January 17, 2022, Buggs was signed to the practice squad of the Las Vegas Raiders.

=== Detroit Lions ===
On July 22, 2022, Buggs signed with the Detroit Lions. He played in all 17 games with 13 starts, recording 46 tackles, two passes defensed, and a forced fumble.

On March 13, 2023, Buggs signed a two-year, $6.2-million contract extension with the Lions. He was released on January 2, 2024.

=== Kansas City Chiefs ===
On January 4, 2024, Buggs was signed to the Kansas City Chiefs practice squad. Buggs won his first Super Bowl when the Chiefs defeated the San Francisco 49ers 25–22 in Super Bowl LVIII. On February 14, Buggs signed a reserve/future contract with the Chiefs. On June 24, 2024, Buggs was released by the Chiefs in response to multiple legal incidents in the offseason. He was sentenced to 60 days in jail and 2 years probation for his crimes against cruelty to animals.

=== San Antonio Brahmas ===
Buggs signed with the San Antonio Brahmas of the UFL on May 1, 2025.

=== Orlando Storm ===
On January 13, 2026, Buggs was selected by the Orlando Storm in the 2026 UFL Draft.

== Personal life ==
On May 29, 2024, Buggs was accused of animal cruelty in Tuscaloosa, Alabama, after his dogs were found in March chained up with no access to food or water and were surrounded by feces. The dogs were seized from his property on March 28 due to being "malnourished, emaciated and neglected."

On June 16, 2024, Buggs was arrested for a second time in less than a month and is facing charges of second-degree domestic violence and burglary.
