= Deionte Thompson =

American football player (born 1997)

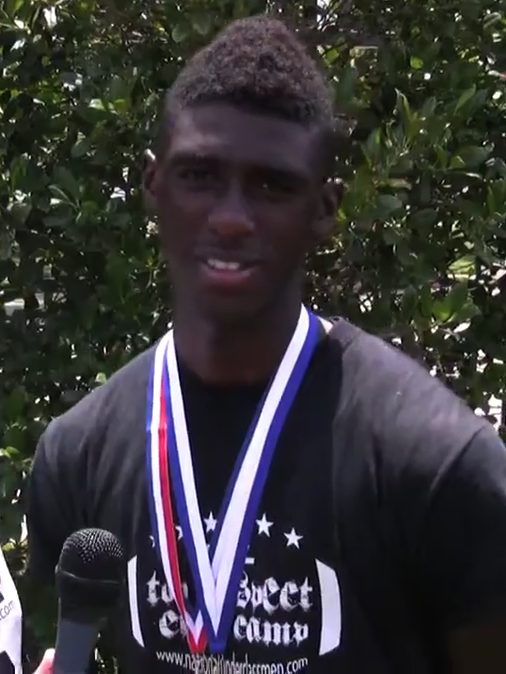
- Thompson in 2012

No. 35, 22
- Position: Safety

Personal information
- Born: February 11, 1997 (age 29); Orange, Texas, U.S.
- Listed height: 6 ft 1 in (1.85 m)
- Listed weight: 195 lb (88 kg)

Career information
- High school: West Orange-Stark (Orange)
- College: Alabama (2015–2018)
- NFL draft: 2019: 5th round, 139th overall pick

Career history
- Arizona Cardinals (2019–2022); Jacksonville Jaguars (2022)*
- * Offseason or practice squad member only

Awards and highlights
- 2× CFP national champion (2015, 2017); Consensus All-American (2018); First-team All-SEC (2018)

Career NFL statistics
- Total tackles: 54
- Pass deflections: 3
- Stats at Pro Football Reference

Deionte Thompson (born February 11, 1997) is a former American professional football safety. He played college football for the Alabama Crimson Tide.

== Early life ==
Thompson attended West Orange-Stark High School in West Orange, Texas. During his high school career he had 15 interceptions. He committed to the University of Alabama to play college football.

== College career ==
After redshirting his first year at Alabama in 2015, Thompson played in 14 games in 2016, recording nine tackles. As a sophomore in 2017, he played in 14 games with two starts and had 25 tackles and one interception. Thompson took over as a starter in 2018. In 14 games he had 78 tackles and 2 interceptions. After the 2018 season, Thompson decided to forgo his senior year to pursue a career in the NFL.

== Professional career ==
Pre-draft measurables
Height	Weight	Arm length	Hand span	Wingspan	Vertical jump	Broad jump
6 ft 1 in (1.85 m)	195 lb (88 kg)	32 1/8 in (0.82 m)	9 7/8 in (0.25 m)	6 ft 4 3/4 in (1.95 m)	33.0 in (0.84 m)	9 ft 10 in (3.00 m)
All values from NFL Combine/Pro Day

=== Arizona Cardinals ===
Thompson was selected by the Arizona Cardinals in the fifth round (139th overall) of the 2019 NFL draft. In his rookie season, Thompson appeared in 11 games and recorded 18 tackles.

Thompson was placed on the reserve/COVID-19 list by the team on November 24, 2020, and activated on December 3.

On September 27, 2022, Thompson was waived by the Cardinals.

=== Jacksonville Jaguars ===
On October 19, 2022, Thompson was signed to the practice squad of the Jacksonville Jaguars. He signed a reserve/future contract on February 13, 2023. He was released on May 16, 2023.
