= Mack Wilson =

American football player (born 1998)

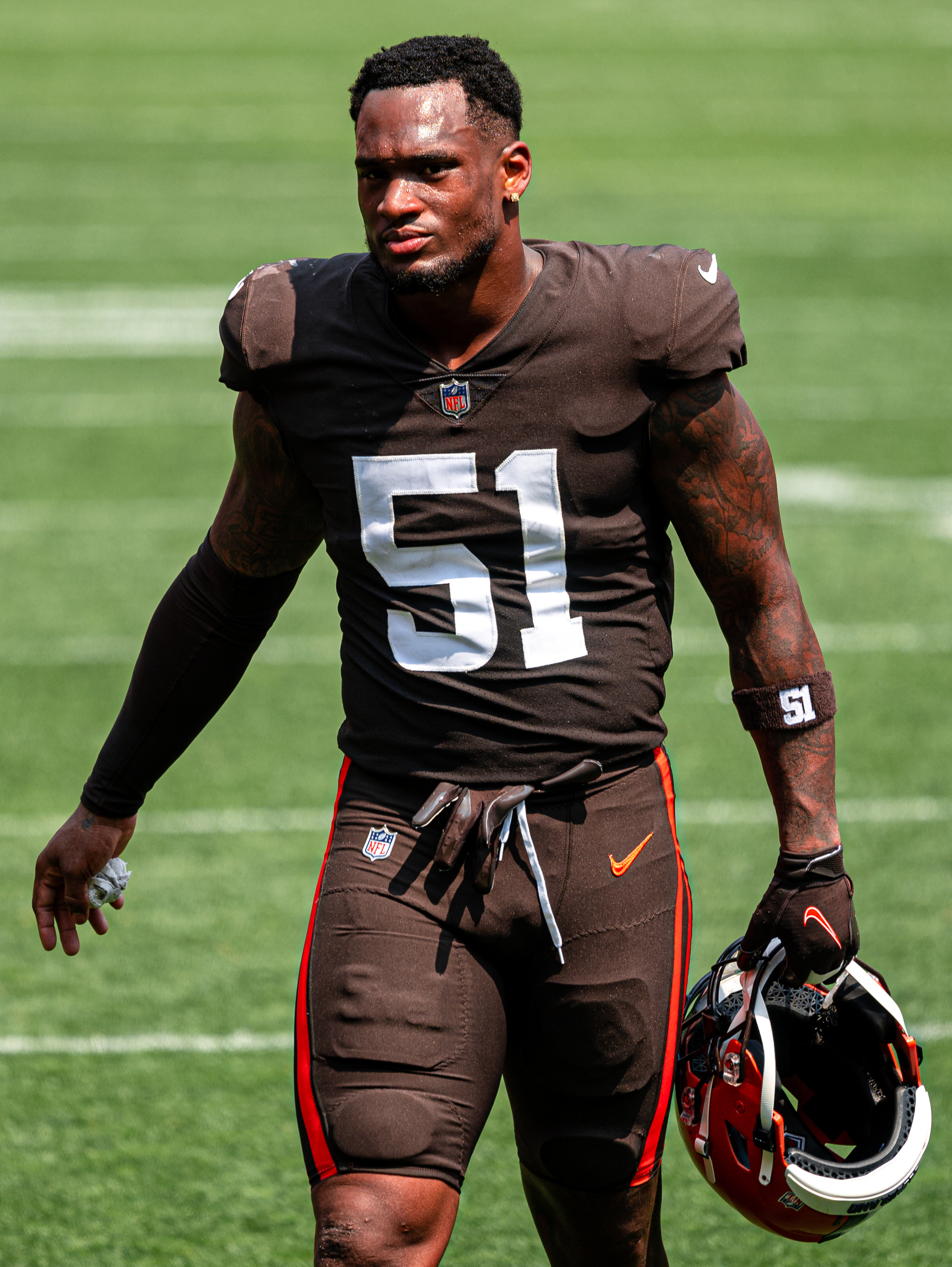
- Wilson with the Cleveland Browns in 2021

No. 1 – Arizona Cardinals
- Position: Inside linebacker
- Roster status: Active

Personal information
- Born: February 14, 1998 (age 28); Montgomery, Alabama, U.S.
- Listed height: 6 ft 1 in (1.85 m)
- Listed weight: 240 lb (109 kg)

Career information
- High school: Carver (Montgomery)
- College: Alabama (2016–2018)
- NFL draft: 2019: 5th round, 155th overall pick

Career history
- Cleveland Browns (2019–2021); New England Patriots (2022–2023); Arizona Cardinals (2024–present)

Awards and highlights
- CFP national champion (2017); Second-team All-SEC (2018)

Career NFL statistics as of 2025
- Total tackles: 371
- Sacks: 9
- Forced fumbles: 5
- Fumble recoveries: 1
- Pass deflections: 24
- Interceptions: 3
- Stats at Pro Football Reference

Lyndell Santrell "Mack" Wilson Sr. (born February 14, 1998) is an American professional football inside linebacker for the Arizona Cardinals of the National Football League (NFL). He played college football for the Alabama Crimson Tide.

== Early life ==
Wilson attended George Washington Carver High School in Montgomery, Alabama. A five star recruit, he committed to University of Alabama to play college football.

== College career ==
Wilson played in all 15 games as a true freshman at Alabama in 2016, recording eight tackles. As a sophomore in 2017, he played in 12 games with two starts and had 40 tackles and four interceptions and one touchdown. As a junior in 2018, Wilson had 71 tackles, one sack, and two interceptions. After the season, Wilson decided to forgo his senior year and enter the 2019 NFL draft.

== Professional career ==
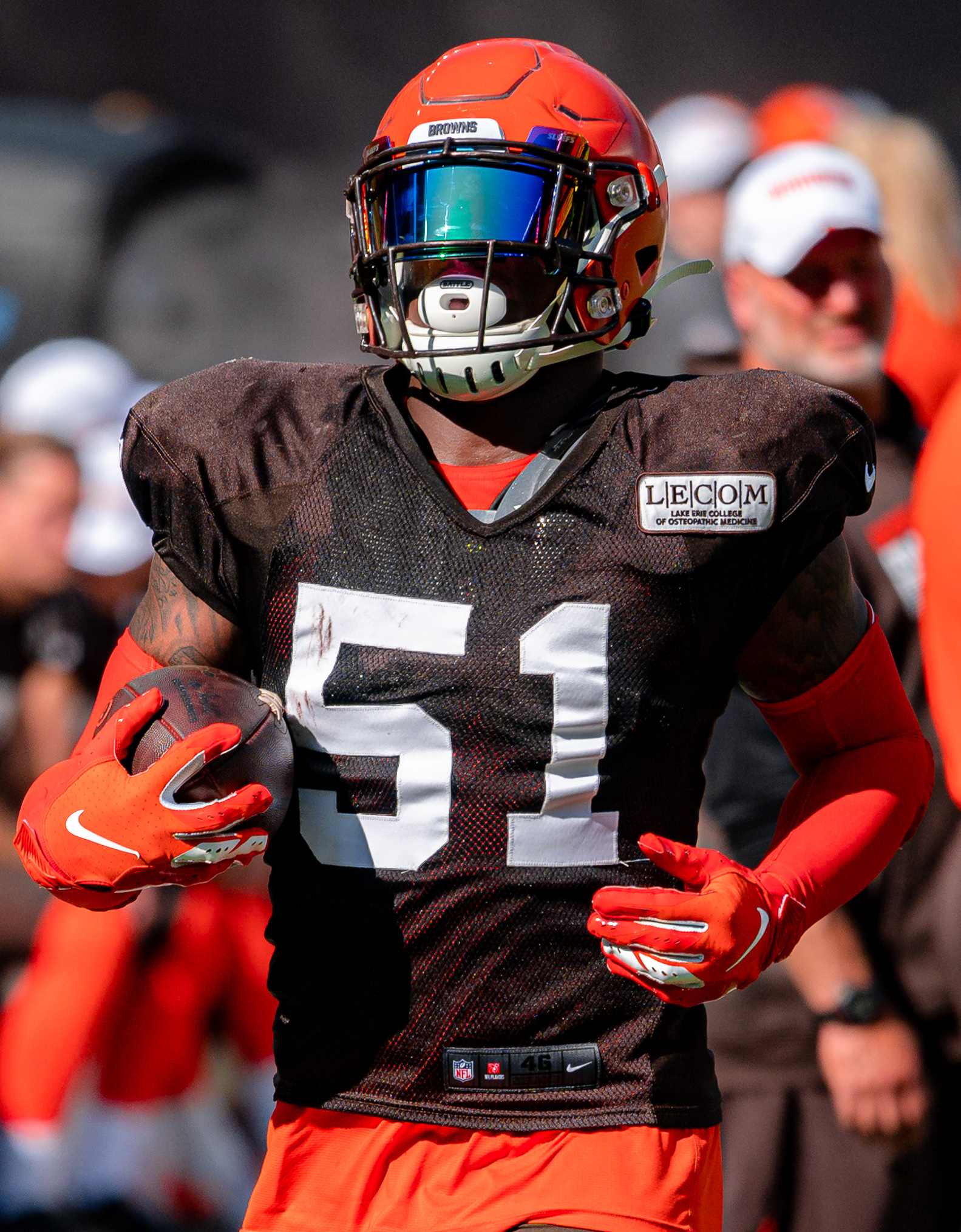
Wilson in 2019

Pre-draft measurables
Height	Weight	Arm length	Hand span	Wingspan	40-yard dash	10-yard split	20-yard split	20-yard shuttle	Three-cone drill	Vertical jump	Broad jump
6 ft 1 1/8 in (1.86 m)	240 lb (109 kg)	32 3/8 in (0.82 m)	9 1/4 in (0.23 m)	6 ft 3 7/8 in (1.93 m)	4.71 s	1.63 s	2.78 s	4.50 s	7.20 s	33.0 in (0.84 m)	10 ft 1 in (3.07 m)
All values from NFL Combine/Pro Day

=== Cleveland Browns ===
Wilson was selected by the Cleveland Browns in the fifth round (155th overall) in the 2019 NFL draft. In Week 9 against the Denver Broncos, Wilson recorded a team high five tackles and made his first career sack on Brandon Allen in the 24–19 loss. In Week 15 against the Arizona Cardinals, Wilson recorded his first career interception off a pass thrown by fellow rookie Kyler Murray during the 38–24 loss. As a rookie, Wilson appeared in all 16 games, and started 14 of them. He finished with one sack, 82 total tackles, one interception, seven passes defended, and one forced fumble.

In the 2020 season, Wilson finished with 39 total tackles and two passes defended in 13 games, of which he started eight. In the 2021 season, Wilson finished with 42 total tackles in 14 games, of which he started six.

=== New England Patriots ===
On March 16, 2022, Wilson was traded to the New England Patriots in exchange for Chase Winovich. In the 2022 season, he appeared in all 17 games, of which he started three. He finished with 1.5 sacks, 36 total tackles, one pass defended, and one forced fumble.

On March 20, 2023, Wilson re-signed with the Patriots on a one-year contract extension. In the 2023 season, he finished with 3.5 sacks, 37 total tackles (24 solo), and three passes defended.

=== Arizona Cardinals ===
On March 14, 2024, Wilson signed a three-year contract with the Arizona Cardinals. He started 16 games for Arizona, recording one interception, five pass deflections, one fumble recovery, three sacks, and 75 combined tackles.

Wilson began the 2025 season as one of Arizona's starting linebackers, recording one interception, six pass deflections, one forced fumble, and 60 combined tackles over eight starts. After suffering a rib injury in Week 9 against the Dallas Cowboys, he was placed on injured reserve on November 15, 2025.

== Career statistics ==
=== NFL ===
Legend
**Bold**	Career high

==== Regular season ====
Year	Team	Games		Tackles					Interceptions						Fumbles	
Year	Team	GP	GS	Cmb	Solo	Ast	Sck	TFL	PD	Int	Yds	Avg	Lng	TD	FF	FR
2019	CLE	16	14	**82**	**57**	25	1.0	**4**	**7**	**1**	**21**	**21.0**	**21**	0	1	0
2020	CLE	13	8	39	24	15	0.0	1	2	0	0	0.0	0	0	0	0
2021	CLE	14	6	42	26	16	0.0	0	0	0	0	0.0	0	0	0	0
2022	NE	17	3	36	15	21	1.5	2	1	0	0	0.0	0	0	1	0
2023	NE	17	1	37	24	13	**3.5**	**4**	3	0	0	0.0	0	0	**2**	0
2024	ARI	16	16	75	44	**31**	3.0	**4**	5	**1**	0	0.0	0	0	0	**1**
2025	ARI	8	8	60	34	26	0.0	3	6	**1**	9	9.0	9	0	1	0
Total		101	56	371	224	147	9.0	18	24	3	30	10.0	21	0	5	1

==== Postseason ====
Year	Team	Games		Tackles					Interceptions						Fumbles		
Year	Team	GP	GS	Cmb	Solo	Ast	Sck	TFL	PD	Int	Yds	Avg	Lng	TD	FF	FR	
Year	2020	CLE	2	0	5	3	2	0.0	0	0	0	0	0.0	0	0	0	0
Year	Total		2	0	5	3	2	0.0	0	0	0	0	0.0	0	0	0	0

=== College ===
College statistics
Season	Class	Pos	GP	Tackles					Interceptions					Fumbles			
Season	Class	Pos	GP	Solo	Ast	Cmb	TfL	Sck	Int	Yds	Avg	TD	PD	FR	Yds	TD	FF
2016	FR	LB	8	5	3	8	0.0	0.0	0	0	0.0	0	0	1	0	0	0
2017	SO	LB	11	21	19	40	2.5	0.0	4	39	9.8	1	2	0	0	0	0
2018	JR	LB	14	33	32	65	4.5	1.0	2	0	0.0	0	5	0	0	0	0
Total			33	59	54	113	7.0	1.0	6	39	6.5	1	7	1	0	0	0
