= Saivion Smith =

American football player (born 1997)

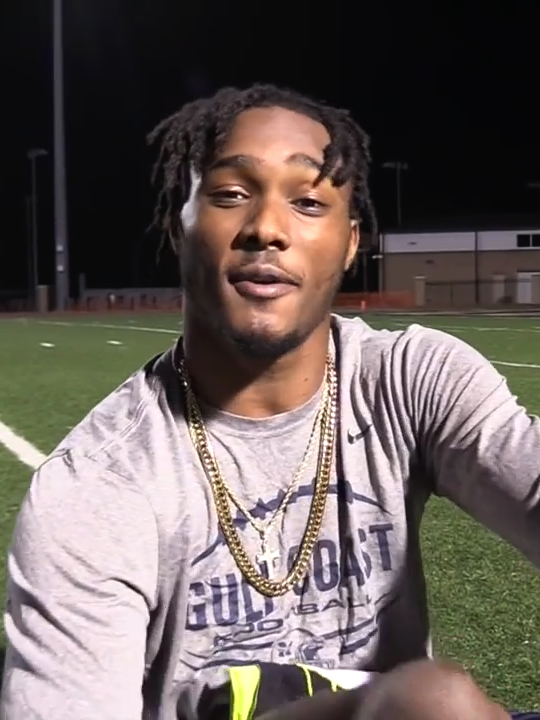
- Smith in 2017

No. 32, 47, 19, 29
- Position: Cornerback

Personal information
- Born: November 5, 1997 (age 29); St. Petersburg, Florida, U.S.
- Listed height: 6 ft 1 in (1.85 m)
- Listed weight: 200 lb (91 kg)

Career information
- High school: IMG Academy (Bradenton, Florida)
- College: LSU (2016); Mississippi Gulf Coast (2017); Alabama (2018)
- NFL draft: 2019: undrafted

Career history
- Jacksonville Jaguars (2019)*; Houston Roughnecks (2020); Dallas Cowboys (2020); Seattle Seahawks (2021)*; Denver Broncos (2021)*; San Francisco 49ers (2021); Detroit Lions (2021–2022)
- * Offseason or practice squad member only

Career NFL statistics
- Total tackles: 5
- Stats at Pro Football Reference

Saivion Smith (born November 5, 1997) is an American former professional football player who was a cornerback in the National Football League (NFL). He played college football for the Alabama Crimson Tide.

== Early life ==
Smith attended Lakewood High School. He transferred to IMG Academy after his sophomore season. As a junior, he had 67 tackles, 5 interceptions and 4 fumble recoveries.

As a senior, he tallied 43 tackles, one pass defensed, one blocked punt and three blocked field goals. He received USA Today All-USA High School All-American honors. He was considered a four-star prospect according to Rivals.com.

== College career ==
Smith accepted a football scholarship from Louisiana State University. As a true freshman, he appeared in 10 games as a backup cornerback, collecting 4 tackles and 4 passes defensed.

He enrolled at Mississippi Gulf Coast Community College for the 2017 season. As a sophomore, he appeared in 12 games, registering 31 tackles (one for loss), 2 interceptions (one returned for a touchdown), 6 passes defensed (led the team), 26 kickoff returns for 718 yards (27.6-yard avg.) and one touchdown.

As a junior playing at the University of Alabama in 2018, he appeared in 15 games with 12 starts, posting 60 tackles, 3 interceptions (led the team), 5 passes defensed and one forced fumble. He returned an interception for a 38-yard touchdown against Arkansas State University. He had 4 tackles and 2 interceptions against the University of Missouri. He struggled in the 44–16 loss against Clemson University in the national championship game, allowing 3 receptions for 162 receiving yards and leaving the contest with an ankle injury. He declared for the NFL draft before the start of his senior season on January 12, 2019.

== Professional career ==
Pre-draft measurables
Height	Weight	Arm length	Hand span	40-yard dash	10-yard split	20-yard split	20-yard shuttle	Three-cone drill	Vertical jump	Broad jump	Bench press
6 ft 0 7/8 in (1.85 m)	199 lb (90 kg)	33 1/4 in (0.84 m)	9 1/2 in (0.24 m)	4.66 s	1.61 s	2.73 s	4.37 s	7.09 s	33.0 in (0.84 m)	10 ft 1 in (3.07 m)	11 reps

=== Jacksonville Jaguars ===
Smith was signed as an undrafted free agent by the Jacksonville Jaguars after the 2019 NFL draft on April 27, after dropping because of his 40-yard times at the NFL Scouting Combine. He was waived on August 30.

=== Houston Roughnecks ===
In 2020, he was selected in the XFL Supplemental Draft by the Houston Roughnecks. He had 8 tackles and one pass defensed in the first two games. He was declared inactive in the final three contests of the season. In March, amid the COVID-19 pandemic, the league announced that it would be canceling the rest of the season. In April, the XFL suspended operations and filed for bankruptcy.

=== Dallas Cowboys ===
On April 10, 2020, Smith was signed as a free agent by the Dallas Cowboys. On August 1, he was placed on the reserve/COVID-19 list, and was activated eight days later. Smith was waived on September 5, and was re-signed to the team's practice squad the following day. On September 26, he was promoted to the active roster to replace an injured Chidobe Awuzie. Smith was waived on October 20, and re-signed to the practice squad two days later. He was elevated to the active roster on October 31, November 7, December 8, and December 12 for the team's Weeks 8, 9, 13, and 14 games against the Philadelphia Eagles, Pittsburgh Steelers, Baltimore Ravens, and Cincinnati Bengals, and reverted to the practice squad after each game. On December 19, Smith was placed on the practice squad/injured list. On January 4, 2021, he signed a reserve/future contract. On May 5, 2021, he was waived after the Cowboys used eight of their 11 selections in the 2021 NFL draft on defensive players.

=== Seattle Seahawks ===
On May 6, 2021, Smith was claimed off waivers by the Seattle Seahawks. He was waived by the Seahawks on July 26.

=== Denver Broncos ===
On August 3, 2021, Smith signed with the Denver Broncos. He was waived by Denver on August 31, and later re-signed to the team's practice squad. Smith was released by Denver on October 26.

=== San Francisco 49ers ===
On November 11, 2021, Smith signed with the San Francisco 49ers. He was promoted to the active roster on December 11. After participating in the team's Week 14 game against the Cincinnati Bengals on December 12, he was waived on December 13.

=== Detroit Lions ===
On December 14, 2021, Smith was claimed off waivers by the Detroit Lions. He was released on January 6, 2022 and re-signed to the practice squad. He signed a reserve/future contract with the Lions on January 10.

On August 30, 2022, Smith was waived by the Lions and signed to the practice squad the next day. He was promoted to the active roster on October 8. In the game versus the New England Patriots on October 9 he suffered an injury during the second defensive play of the game, and was taken off the field in an ambulance. On October 19 he was placed on the practice squad/injured list, and on October 26 it was reported that he would undergo neck surgery and would be out for the remainder of the season.

Smith was re-signed by the Lions on April 17, 2023. He was waived on August 23.
