= Lester Cotton =

American football player (born 1996)

Profile
- Position: Guard

Personal information
- Born: February 20, 1996 (age 30); Tuscaloosa, Alabama, U.S.
- Listed height: 6 ft 4 in (1.93 m)
- Listed weight: 330 lb (150 kg)

Career information
- High school: Central Tuscaloosa
- College: Alabama (2015–2018)
- NFL draft: 2019: undrafted

Career history
- Las Vegas Raiders (2019–2022); Miami Dolphins (2022–2024); New England Patriots (2024)

Awards and highlights
- 2× CFP national champion (2015, 2017)

Career NFL statistics as of 2024
- Games played: 46
- Games started: 9
- Stats at Pro Football Reference

Lester Cotton Sr. (born February 20, 1996) is an American professional football guard. He was signed as an undrafted free agent following the 2019 NFL draft by the Las Vegas Raiders. He played college football for the Alabama Crimson Tide.

== Early life ==
Lester Cotton was born on February 20, 1996, in Tuscaloosa, Alabama, and went to high school at Central High School in Tuscaloosa. He was a four-star prospect and played in the 2015 Under Armour All-America game. He also was named the no. 3 offensive guard nationally by Rivals.com.

=== Awards and honors ===
- Nike's 2014 "The Opening"
- 2015 Parade All-America team
- 2015 Under Armour All-America Game
- Medium School All-American by MaxPreps.com
- No. 3 offensive guard nationally by Rivals.com
- No. 46 in Rivals100
- No. 2 player in the state of Alabama by Rivals.com
- No. 59 in the Top247, the No. 4 offensive guard and No. 3 player in the state
- No. 54 in the 247Composite and the No. 4 guard
- Rated by Scout.com as the third-best offensive guard and the No. 66 player in the Scout300
- No. 100 in the ESPN300, the No. 7 guard, No. 5 player in Alabama and No. 51 in the Southeast region
- No. 59 on the Prepstar Top 150 Dream Team
- 2014 AL.com Super All-State
- No. 3 on the final AL.com A-List
- First-team 5A All-State by the Alabama Sports Writers Association
- ASWA 5A Lineman of the Year
- 2014 Alabama-Mississippi All-Star Game

== College career ==
Cotton chose Alabama over scholarship offers from Auburn, USC, Mississippi State and Ole Miss.

=== 2015 ===
He played in four games in his first season.

=== 2016 ===
He started the Crimson Tide's first two games of the season at left guard and started three games more games while playing right guard. He also played in nine other games. He was a blocker for nine 100-yard rushing games. Against USC he played 59 snaps at left guard with and had one knockdown block. He did not allow a pressure or a sack against them as he opened holes for 242 rushing yards. Against Kent State he came off the bench to play 25 snaps and helped the Tide rush for 285 yards. When they played the Tennessee Volunteers Cotton started at right guard and helped cleared a path for 409 yards rushing and 594 yards of offense. Versus Texas A&M he recorded six knockdown blocks and opened holes for 287 yards on the ground and 451 yards of total offense. He played 12 games in 2016.

=== 2017 ===
Cotton established a starting role at right guard as a junior in 2017 and started 13 games. Against Florida State Cotton helped make holes for 173 rushing yards in a 24–7 win over the No. 3 ranked Seminoles. When the Tide played Fresno State he had one knockdown block in 44 snaps in a win over the Bulldogs. He did not commit any penalties in the game. The Tide had 305 rushing yards in the win. He recorded two knockdown blocks while he helped open holes for 239 rushing yards and 487 total yards against Colorado State. When they played Vanderbilt, Cotton helped clear a path for 496 rushing yards and 677 total yards. He was graded out at 88 percent with six knockdown blocks. He started and played 55 snaps as the Crimson Tide beat the Ole Miss Rebels 66–3. Cotton played all 69 snaps on offense when they played Texas A&M. He blocked for his 6th 100-yard rushing game against Arkansas. Cotton did not allow a sack or pressure in a 45–7 win against Tennessee. Cotton made his ninth consecutive start vs.LSU. He was graded out at 89 percent on 34 snaps in a 56–0 win over Mercer. He did not allow a sack, pressure or hurry in the game. They had 530 yards of total offense, split evenly with 265 both in passing and rushing. Against Clemson he played 57 snaps in the Tide's 24–6 win in the Sugar Bowl before a knee injury forced him out of the game. He was graded out at 85 percent. He missed the CFP National Championship against Georgia because of an injury. He was a finalist for the Joe Moore award.

=== 2018 ===
In 2018 he moved to left guard after playing right guard in the past. He made his first start as left guard against Louisville. Cotton played 70 snaps against Arkansas State. He did not allow a sack and had three knockdown blocks against Ole Miss. He had two knockdown blocks against Texas A&M. Against Louisiana he played 42 snaps and had two knockdown blocks. He also did not allow a sack, pressure or commit a penalty. The Tide had a season high 639 yards against Arkansas. He played 53 snaps after coming off the bench against Mississippi State. Cotton came off the bench in relief of Deonte Brown to play 39 snaps in the SEC Championship Game. He returned to the starting lineup against Oklahoma and provided time for 528 yards of total offense. He finished his career with 28 starts. The Tide's offensive line only allowed an average of 1 sack per game in 2018.

== Professional career ==
Pre-draft measurables
Height	Weight	Arm length	Hand span	40-yard dash	10-yard split	20-yard split	20-yard shuttle	Three-cone drill	Vertical jump	Broad jump	Bench press
6 ft 3 3/4 in (1.92 m)	336 lb (152 kg)	32 1/4 in (0.82 m)	9 3/4 in (0.25 m)	5.30 s	1.84 s	3.08 s	5.00 s	8.23 s	24.0 in (0.61 m)	8 ft 4 in (2.54 m)	24 reps
All values from Pro Day

=== Las Vegas Raiders ===
Cotton was signed as an undrafted free agent after the 2019 NFL draft. He was released at roster cuts but was later signed to the practice squad. In December he was promoted to the active roster and played one snap in one game. He was active for 3 games but only played in one. He was released at roster cuts in 2020. In February 2021, he was signed again.

On August 31, 2021, Cotton was waived by the Raiders and re-signed to the practice squad the next day. After the Raiders were eliminated in the 2021 Wild Card round of the playoffs, he signed a reserve/future contract on January 17, 2022.

Cotton made the Raiders final roster in 2022 as a backup interior lineman. He made his first career start at right guard in Week 2 in a spot start. On December 3, 2022, Cotton was placed on injured reserve. He was released on December 15.

=== Miami Dolphins ===
On December 20, 2022, Cotton was signed to the Miami Dolphins practice squad. He signed a reserve/future contract on January 16, 2023. Cotton played in 11 games with Miami in 2024 and was released on November 25, 2024.

=== New England Patriots ===
On November 26, 2024, Cotton was claimed off waivers by the New England Patriots.
