= Ale Kaho =

American football player (born 2000)

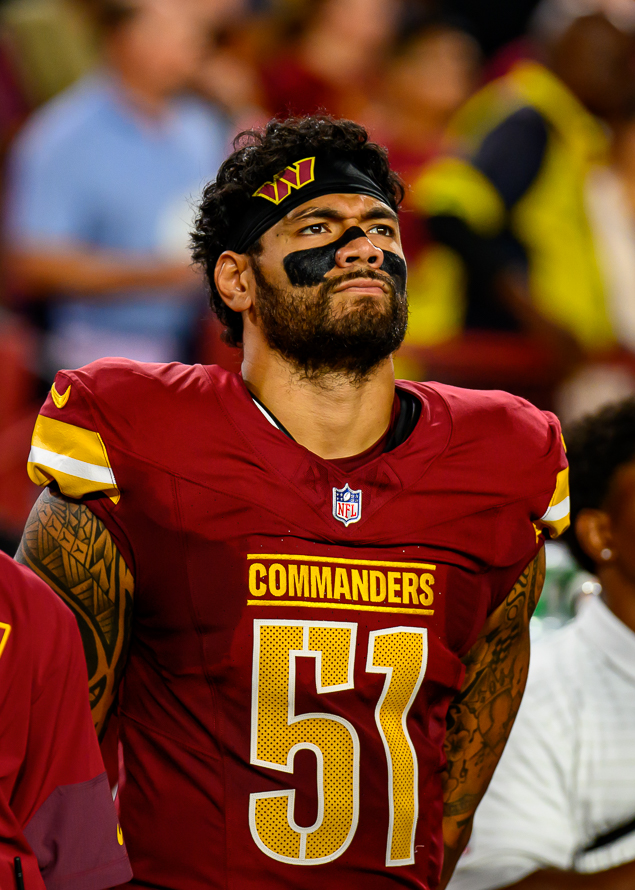
- Kaho with the Washington Commanders in 2025

No. 51 – Washington Commanders
- Position: Linebacker
- Roster status: Active

Personal information
- Born: April 7, 2000 (age 26); Reno, Nevada, U.S.
- Listed height: 6 ft 2 in (1.88 m)
- Listed weight: 230 lb (104 kg)

Career information
- High school: Reno (NV)
- College: Alabama (2018–2020); UCLA (2021–2024)
- NFL draft: 2025: undrafted

Career history
- Washington Commanders (2025–present)

Awards and highlights
- CFP national champion (2020)

Career NFL statistics as of 2025
- Tackles: 5
- Stats at Pro Football Reference

Brandon Alefosio Kaho Tu'amoheloa (born April 7, 2000) is an American professional football linebacker for the Washington Commanders of the National Football League (NFL). He played college football for the Alabama Crimson Tide and UCLA Bruins, winning a national championship with Alabama in 2020. Kaho signed with the Commanders as an undrafted free agent in 2025.

== Early life ==
Kaho was born on April 7, 2000, in Reno, Nevada. Kaho attended Reno High School where he played football and was named first-team all-league at three positions: running back, defensive end and punter. In 2017, he contributed to Reno's team which reached the Northern 4A Regional championship. His younger brother, Vai Kaho, also played college football as a linebacker for San Diego State.

A five-star recruit and the top linebacker in the 2018 recruiting class, he initially signed to play college football for the Washington Huskies, before later departing the team and committing to the Alabama Crimson Tide.

== College career ==
Kaho recorded 11 tackles for Alabama as a freshman in 2018. He then recorded 20 tackles and three blocked punts during the 2019 season, being selected Alabama's special teams player of the week four times. He appeared in 12 games during the 2020 season and was a member of Alabama's national championship team. After the season, he entered the NCAA transfer portal and initially committed to the Utah Utes before changing his commitment to the UCLA Bruins. In 2021, with UCLA, he appeared in 11 games, posting 32 tackles, three sacks and a blocked punt. However, Kaho was limited to just one game in the subsequent two seasons due to injuries. In his final season, 2024, he appeared in eight games and tallied 26 tackles and a sack.

== Professional career ==
Pre-draft measurables
Height	Weight	Arm length	Hand span	Wingspan	40-yard dash	10-yard split	20-yard split	20-yard shuttle	Three-cone drill	Vertical jump	Broad jump	Bench press
6 ft 1 5/8 in (1.87 m)	231 lb (105 kg)	32 7/8 in (0.84 m)	8 1/2 in (0.22 m)	6 ft 5 7/8 in (1.98 m)	4.50 s	1.64 s	2.60 s	4.38 s	7.04 s	33.0 in (0.84 m)	9 ft 11 in (3.02 m)	14 reps
All values from Pro Day

Kaho signed with the Washington Commanders as an undrafted free agent on May 8, 2025.

Kaho was released by the Commanders as a part of final roster cuts on August 30, 2026; he was re-signed to their practice squad the following day. On November 12, the team signed him to their active roster.

== Personal life ==
Kaho is Tongan American.
