= 2017 Alabama Crimson Tide football team =

American college football season

2017 Alabama Crimson Tide football

Consensus national champion SEC Western Division co-champion Sugar Bowl champion

Sugar Bowl (CFP Semifinal), W 24–6 vs. Clemson CFP National Championship W 26–23 ^{OT} vs. Georgia
- Conference: Southeastern Conference
- Western Division

Ranking
- Coaches: No. 1
- AP: No. 1
- Record: 13–1 (7–1 SEC)
- Head coach: Nick Saban (11th season)
- Offensive coordinator: Brian Daboll (1st season)
- Co-offensive coordinator: Mike Locksley (1st season)
- Offensive scheme: Multiple
- Defensive coordinator: Jeremy Pruitt (2nd season)
- Co-defensive coordinator: Tosh Lupoi (1st season)
- Base defense: 3–4
- Captains: Minkah Fitzpatrick; Rashaan Evans; Shaun Dion Hamilton; Bradley Bozeman
- Home stadium: Bryant–Denny Stadium

Uniform
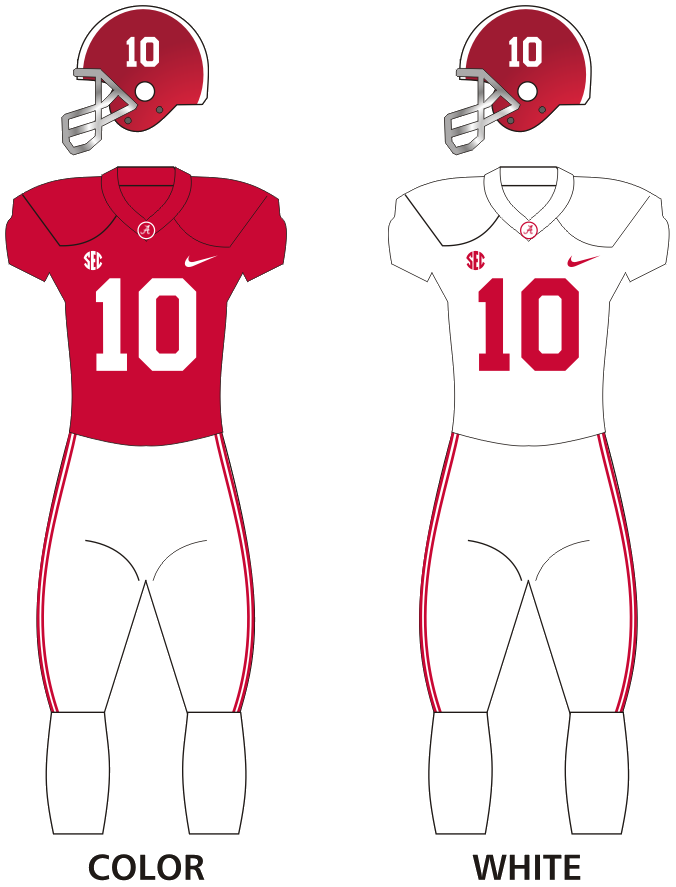

2017 Southeastern Conference football standings
	Conf.			Overall
Team	W		L	W		L
Eastern Division
No. 2 Georgia x$^	7	–	1	13	–	2
South Carolina	5	–	3	9	–	4
Kentucky	4	–	4	7	–	6
Missouri	4	–	4	7	–	6
Florida	3	–	5	4	–	7
Vanderbilt	1	–	7	5	–	7
Tennessee	0	–	8	4	–	8
Western Division
No. 10 Auburn xy	7	–	1	10	–	4
No. 1 Alabama x#^	7	–	1	13	–	1
No. 18 LSU	6	–	2	9	–	4
No. 19 Mississippi State	4	–	4	9	–	4
Texas A&M	4	–	4	7	–	6
Ole Miss*	3	–	5	6	–	6
Arkansas	1	–	7	4	–	8
Championship: Georgia 28, Auburn 7
# – College Football Playoff champion; ^ – College Football Playoff participant; $ – Conference champion; x – Division champion/co-champions; y – Championship game participant; * Ole Miss ineligible for postseason due to NCAA sanctions; Rankings from AP Poll

The 2017 Alabama Crimson Tide football team represented the University of Alabama during the 2017 NCAA Division I FBS football season. This season marked the Crimson Tide's 123rd overall season, its 84th as a member of the Southeastern Conference (SEC) and its 26th within the SEC Western Division. They played their home games at Bryant–Denny Stadium in Tuscaloosa, Alabama and were led by eleventh-year head coach Nick Saban.

Alabama ended the season as national champions by winning their second College Football Playoff national championship. This was their 17th claimed national title in school history and fifth under head coach Nick Saban.

Alabama, coming off a national title game loss to Clemson in 2016, began the year ranked first in the AP Poll. The team opened the year with a victory over then-No. 3 Florida State in the Chick-fil-A Kickoff Game, which was the highest ranked season-opening match-up in the history of the AP Poll. Alabama won their first 11 games convincingly, but fell on the road to rival Auburn in the regular season finale, and since the two teams were tied atop the SEC West Division at 7–1, Auburn advanced to the 2017 SEC Championship Game on the head-to-head tiebreaker. Alabama fell to number six in the rankings leading up to conference championship weekend. In the final College Football Playoff rankings of the year, 11–1 Alabama rose to number four after sitting idle, ahead of 12–1 Wisconsin, 11–2 Big Ten Conference champion Ohio State and 12–0 American Athletic Conference champion UCF. This earned Alabama a place in the national semi-final to be played at the Sugar Bowl against first-seeded Clemson, the third consecutive playoff meeting between the two schools. Alabama won by a score of 24–6 and advanced to the 2018 College Football Playoff National Championship against SEC champion Georgia. The Crimson Tide pulled off an overtime victory to win the game 26–23 and the national title.

Alabama's offense was led by sophomore quarterback Jalen Hurts, who finished with 2,081 passing yards, 17 passing touchdowns and just one interception. He added 855 rushing yards and 8 rushing touchdowns on the ground. Freshman quarterback Tua Tagovailoa served as the backup and was named game MVP of the national championship game after Hurts was benched at halftime. Running back Damien Harris led the rushing attack with exactly 1,000 rushing yards and 11 touchdowns on the year. Wide receiver Calvin Ridley and offensive tackle Jonah Williams were named first-team All-SEC. The Crimson Tide defense, which led the country in scoring and yards allowed, was led by consensus first-team All-American and Chuck Bednarik Award-winning safety Minkah Fitzpatrick. He was joined on the All-SEC team by defensive tackles Daron Payne and Raekwon Davis, linebacker Rashaan Evans, and safety Ronnie Harrison.

== Offseason ==
=== Departures ===
The Crimson Tide lost twenty-three senior football players to graduation, another four players to the NFL Draft, and four more players from the 2016 team due to various other reasons.

Offseason departures
Name	Number	Pos.	Height	Weight	Year	Hometown	Notes
Jonathan Allen	#93	DE	6'3	291	Senior	Leesburg, VA	Graduated
Ryan Anderson	#22	LB	6'2	253	RS Senior	Daphne, AL	Graduated
O. J. Howard	#88	TE	6'6	251	Senior	Prattville, AL	Graduated
Truett Harris	#86	TE	6'3	235	Senior	Brentwood, TN	Graduated
Brandon Moore	#17	OL	6'0	248	Senior	Cincinnati, OH	Graduated
Will Davis	#62	OL	6'5	315	Senior	Letohatchee, AL	Graduated
Tim Williams	#56	LB	6'4	252	Senior	Baton Rouge, LA	Graduated
Jake Long	#51	OL	5'9	228	Senior	Vestavia Hills, AL	Graduated
Derrick Garnett	#46	LB	6'1	240	Senior	Tuscaloosa, AL	Graduated
Bo Grant	#45	DB	6'2	195	Senior	Valley, AL	Graduated
Blaine Anderson	#41	DB	5'10	187	Senior	Charlotte, NC	Graduated
Nate Staskelunas	#34	DB	6'3	207	Senior	Greenville, NC	Graduated
Gehrig Dieter	#19	WR	6'3	207	GS Senior	South Bend, IN	Graduated
Reuben Foster	#10	LB	6'1	240	Senior	Auburn, AL	Graduated
Eddie Jackson	#4	DB	6'0	194	Senior	Lauderdale Lakes, FL	Graduated
Blake Barnett	#8	QB	6'5	211	RS Freshman	Corona, CA	Transferred to Arizona State
Cole Mazza	#55	LS	6'2	235	Senior	Bakersfield, CA	Graduated
Dakota Ball	#44	DL	6'3	268	RS Senior	Lindale, GA	Graduated
Alphonse Taylor	#50	OL	6'5	307	RS Senior	Mobile, AL	Graduated
Dalvin Tomlinson	#54	DL	6'3	305	RS Senior	McDonough, GA	Graduated
Korren Kirven	#78	OL	6'4	311	RS Senior	Lynchburg, VA	Graduated
Brandon Greene	#89	TE	6'5	295	RS Senior	Ellenwood, GA	Graduated
Adam Griffith	#99	PK	5'10	191	RS Senior	Calhoun, GA	Graduated
ArDarius Stewart	#13	WR	6'1	204	RS Junior	Fultondale, AL	Declared for the 2017 NFL draft
Marlon Humphrey	#26	DB	6'1	196	RS Sophomore	Hoover, AL	Declared for the 2017 NFL draft
Cooper Bateman	#18	QB	6'3	220	RS Junior	Murray, UT	Transferred to Utah
David Cornwell	#12	QB	6'5	228	RS Sophomore	Norman, OK	Transferred to Nevada
Derrick Gore	#27	RB	5'11	210	RS Sophomore	Syracuse, NY	Transferred to Louisiana-Monroe
Cam Robinson	#74	OL	6'6	310	Junior	Monroe, LA	Declared for the 2017 NFL draft
Josh Palet	#11	QB	6'5	215	Senior	Chula Vista, CA	Graduated

== Preseason ==
=== 2017 recruiting class ===
Alabama signed 29 recruits in its 2017 recruiting class. The class was highlighted by 19 players from the "ESPN 300". Alabama signed the No. 1 recruiting class according to Rivals.com, Scout.com, 247Sports.com, and ESPN.

College recruiting (2017)
Name	Hometown	School	Height	Weight	40^{‡}	Commit date
Christopher Allen #4 ILB	Baton Rouge, LA	Southern University Lab School	6 ft 4 in (1.93 m)	234 lb (106 kg)	–	Nov 27, 2016
Christopher Allen #4 ILB	Recruit ratings: Scout: Rivals: 247Sports: ESPN:					
Elliot Baker #1 OT (JC)	San Francisco, CA	City College of San Francisco	6 ft 7 in (2.01 m)	295 lb (134 kg)	–	Jun 6, 2016
Elliot Baker #1 OT (JC)	Recruit ratings: Scout: Rivals: 247Sports: ESPN:					
Markail Benton #7 OLB	Phenix City, AL	Central High School	6 ft 2 in (1.88 m)	237 lb (108 kg)	–	Jun 10, 2016
Markail Benton #7 OLB	Recruit ratings: Scout: Rivals: 247Sports: ESPN:					
Hunter Brannon #12 OC	Cullman, AL	Cullman HS	6 ft 4 in (1.93 m)	290 lb (130 kg)	5.86	Jul 23, 2016
Hunter Brannon #12 OC	Recruit ratings: Scout: Rivals: 247Sports: ESPN:					
Isaiah Buggs #1 SDE (JC)	Gilbert, LA	Mississippi Gulf Coast CC	6 ft 4 in (1.93 m)	280 lb (130 kg)	–	Dec 13, 2016
Isaiah Buggs #1 SDE (JC)	Recruit ratings: Scout: Rivals: 247Sports: ESPN:					
Joseph Bulovas #6 K	Mandeville, LA	Mandeville HS	6 ft 0 in (1.83 m)	205 lb (93 kg)	–	Jan 25, 2017
Joseph Bulovas #6 K	Recruit ratings: Scout: Rivals: 247Sports: ESPN:					
VanDarius Cowan #4 OLB	Palm Beach Gardens, FL	Palm Beach Gardens HS	6 ft 4 in (1.93 m)	226 lb (103 kg)	4.65	Apr 9, 2016
VanDarius Cowan #4 OLB	Recruit ratings: Scout: Rivals: 247Sports: ESPN:					
Thomas Fletcher #3 LS	Bradenton, FL	IMG Academy	6 ft 4 in (1.93 m)	220 lb (100 kg)	–	Jun 23, 2016
Thomas Fletcher #3 LS	Recruit ratings: Scout: Rivals: 247Sports: ESPN:					
Najee Harris #1 RB	Antioch, CA	Antioch HS	6 ft 3 in (1.91 m)	226 lb (103 kg)	–	Apr 18, 2015
Najee Harris #1 RB	Recruit ratings: Scout: Rivals: 247Sports: ESPN:					
Kedrick James #12 TE	Waco, TX	La Vega HS	6 ft 5 in (1.96 m)	245 lb (111 kg)	5.13	Feb 3, 2016
Kedrick James #12 TE	Recruit ratings: Scout: Rivals: 247Sports: ESPN:					
Jerry Jeudy #3 WR	Deerfield Beach, FL	Deerfield Beach HS	6 ft 1 in (1.85 m)	180 lb (82 kg)	–	Jul 28, 2016
Jerry Jeudy #3 WR	Recruit ratings: Scout: Rivals: 247Sports: ESPN:					
Mac Jones #18 QB-PRO	Jacksonville, FL	The Bolles School	6 ft 3 in (1.91 m)	180 lb (82 kg)	4.91	Jun 7, 2016
Mac Jones #18 QB-PRO	Recruit ratings: Scout: Rivals: 247Sports: ESPN:					
Alex Leatherwood #1 OT	Pensacola, FL	Booker T. Washington HS	6 ft 6 in (1.98 m)	327 lb (148 kg)	–	Jun 2, 2015
Alex Leatherwood #1 OT	Recruit ratings: Scout: Rivals: 247Sports: ESPN:					
Phidarian Mathis #7 DT	Monroe, LA	Neville HS	6 ft 4 in (1.93 m)	287 lb (130 kg)	–	Feb 1, 2017
Phidarian Mathis #7 DT	Recruit ratings: Scout: Rivals: 247Sports: ESPN:					
Kyriq McDonald #45 CB	Madison, AL	James Clemens HS	5 ft 10 in (1.78 m)	190 lb (86 kg)	–	Jul 31, 2016
Kyriq McDonald #45 CB	Recruit ratings: Scout: Rivals: 247Sports: ESPN:					
Xavier McKinney #6 S	Roswell, GA	Roswell HS	6 ft 1 in (1.85 m)	196 lb (89 kg)	4.59	Jan 1, 2017
Xavier McKinney #6 S	Recruit ratings: Scout: Rivals: 247Sports: ESPN:					
Dylan Moses #2 OLB	Bradenton, FL	IMG Academy	6 ft 2 in (1.88 m)	235 lb (107 kg)	–	Oct 2, 2016
Dylan Moses #2 OLB	Recruit ratings: Scout: Rivals: 247Sports: ESPN:					
Kendall Randolph #12 OG	Madison, AL	Bob Jones HS	6 ft 5 in (1.96 m)	285 lb (129 kg)	–	Jul 31, 2016
Kendall Randolph #12 OG	Recruit ratings: Scout: Rivals: 247Sports: ESPN:					
LaBryan Ray #2 SDE	Madison, AL	James Clemens HS	6 ft 5 in (1.96 m)	270 lb (120 kg)	–	Feb 1, 2017
LaBryan Ray #2 SDE	Recruit ratings: Scout: Rivals: 247Sports: ESPN:					
Brian Robinson Jr. #8 RB	Tuscaloosa, AL	Hillcrest HS	6 ft 2 in (1.88 m)	216 lb (98 kg)	4.62	Nov 9, 2015
Brian Robinson Jr. #8 RB	Recruit ratings: Scout: Rivals: 247Sports: ESPN:					
Henry Ruggs #11 WR	Montgomery, AL	Robert E. Lee HS	6 ft 0 in (1.83 m)	175 lb (79 kg)	–	Feb 1, 2017
Henry Ruggs #11 WR	Recruit ratings: Scout: Rivals: 247Sports: ESPN:					
Tyrell Shavers #12 WR	Lewisville, TX	Lewisville HS	6 ft 4 in (1.93 m)	220 lb (100 kg)	–	Jun 13, 2016
Tyrell Shavers #12 WR	Recruit ratings: Scout: Rivals: 247Sports: ESPN:					
DeVonta Smith #9 WR	Amite, LA	Amite HS	6 ft 1 in (1.85 m)	157 lb (71 kg)	–	Feb 1, 2017
DeVonta Smith #9 WR	Recruit ratings: Scout: Rivals: 247Sports: ESPN:					
Tua Tagovailoa #1 QB-DUAL	Honolulu, HI	St. Louis School	6 ft 1 in (1.85 m)	215 lb (98 kg)	–	May 2, 2016
Tua Tagovailoa #1 QB-DUAL	Recruit ratings: Scout: Rivals: 247Sports: ESPN:					
Major Tennison #9 TE	Bullard, TX	Bullard HS	6 ft 5 in (1.96 m)	245 lb (111 kg)	–	Oct 23, 2016
Major Tennison #9 TE	Recruit ratings: Scout: Rivals: 247Sports: ESPN:					
Chadarius Townsend #5 ATH	Tanner, AL	Tanner HS	6 ft 0 in (1.83 m)	180 lb (82 kg)	–	Jul 29, 2015
Chadarius Townsend #5 ATH	Recruit ratings: Scout: Rivals: 247Sports: ESPN:					
Jedrick Wills #7 OT	Lexington, KY	Lafayette HS	6 ft 5 in (1.96 m)	315 lb (143 kg)	5.19	Nov 15, 2016
Jedrick Wills #7 OT	Recruit ratings: Scout: Rivals: 247Sports: ESPN:					
Daniel Wright #16 S	Fort Lauderdale, FL	Boyd Anderson HS	6 ft 0 in (1.83 m)	168 lb (76 kg)	4.71	Dec 9, 2016
Daniel Wright #16 S	Recruit ratings: Scout: Rivals: 247Sports: ESPN:					
Overall recruit ranking: Scout: 1 Rivals: 1 247Sports: 1 ESPN: 1
Note: In many cases, Scout, Rivals, 247Sports, On3, and ESPN may conflict in their listings of height and weight.; In these cases, the average was taken. ESPN grades are on a 100-point scale.; Sources: "2017 Alabama Football Commitment List". Rivals.; "2017 Alabama Commits". Scout.; "2017 Players Commitments – Alabama". ESPN.; "Scout.com Team Recruiting Rankings". Scout.; "2017 Team Ranking". Rivals.com.; "2017 Alabama Crimson Tide football team". 247Sports.

=== Returning starters ===
Alabama returned six starters on offense, six on defense, and one on special teams from the 2016 team.

==== Offense ====
Player	Class	Position
Jalen Hurts	Sophomore	Quarterback
Damien Harris	Junior	Running back
Calvin Ridley	Junior	Wide receiver
Ross Pierschbacher	R-Junior	Guard
Bradley Bozeman	R-Senior	Center
Jonah Williams	Sophomore	Tackle

==== Defense ====
Player	Class	Position
Tony Brown	Senior	Cornerback
Anthony Averett	R-Senior	Cornerback
Minkah Fitzpatrick	Junior	Safety
Shaun Dion Hamilton	Senior	Linebacker
Ronnie Harrison	Junior	Safety
Daron Payne	Junior	Defensive tackle

==== Special teams ====
Player	Class	Position
J. K. Scott	Senior	Punter

=== Spring game ===
2017 A-Day Spring Game

Team	1	2	3	4	Total
White	14	7	0	3	24
• Crimson	7	10	0	10	27

- Location: Tuscaloosa, Alabama
- Television network: ESPN

Alabama's annual A-Day spring game was held on April 22, 2017. Kicker J. K. Scott kicked a field goal as time expired to win the game for the Jalen Hurts-led Crimson team over the Tua Tagovailoa-led White team.

== Schedule ==
Date	Time	Opponent	Rank	Site	TV	Result	Attendance
September 2	7:00 p.m.	vs. No. 3 Florida State*	No. 1	Mercedes-Benz Stadium; Atlanta, GA (Chick-fil-A Kickoff Game, College GameDay)	ABC	W 24–7	76,330
September 9	2:30 p.m.	Fresno State*	No. 1	Bryant–Denny Stadium; Tuscaloosa, AL	ESPN2	W 41–10	101,127
September 16	6:00 p.m.	Colorado State*	No. 1	Bryant–Denny Stadium; Tuscaloosa, AL	ESPN2	W 41–23	101,821
September 23	2:30 p.m.	at Vanderbilt	No. 1	Vanderbilt Stadium; Nashville, TN (SEC Nation)	CBS	W 59–0	40,350
September 30	8:00 p.m.	Ole Miss	No. 1	Bryant–Denny Stadium; Tuscaloosa, AL (rivalry)	ESPN	W 66–3	101,821
October 7	6:15 p.m.	at Texas A&M	No. 1	Kyle Field; College Station, TX	ESPN	W 27–19	101,058
October 14	6:15 p.m.	Arkansas^{†}	No. 1	Bryant–Denny Stadium; Tuscaloosa, AL	ESPN	W 41–9	101,821
October 21	2:30 p.m.	Tennessee	No. 1	Bryant–Denny Stadium; Tuscaloosa, AL (Third Saturday in October, SEC Nation)	CBS	W 45–7	101,821
November 4	7:00 p.m.	No. 19 LSU	No. 2	Bryant–Denny Stadium; Tuscaloosa, AL (rivalry, SEC Nation)	CBS	W 24–10	101,821
November 11	6:00 p.m.	at No. 16 Mississippi State	No. 2	Davis Wade Stadium; Starkville, MS (rivalry)	ESPN	W 31–24	61,344
November 18	11:00 a.m.	Mercer*	No. 1	Bryant–Denny Stadium; Tuscaloosa, AL	SECN	W 56–0	101,821
November 25	2:30 p.m.	at No. 6 Auburn	No. 1	Jordan-Hare Stadium; Auburn, AL (Iron Bowl, College GameDay)	CBS	L 14–26	87,451
January 1, 2018	7:45 p.m.	vs. No. 1 Clemson*	No. 4	Mercedes-Benz Superdome; New Orleans, LA (Sugar Bowl–CFP Semifinal, rivalry, SEC Nation)	ESPN	W 24–6	72,360
January 8, 2018	7:30 p.m.	vs. No. 3 Georgia	No. 4	Mercedes-Benz Stadium; Atlanta, GA (CFP National Championship, rivalry, College GameDay, SEC Nation)	ESPN	W 26–23 ^{OT}	77,430
*Non-conference game; ^{†}Homecoming; Rankings from AP Poll and CFP Rankings after October 31 released prior to game; All times are in Central time

== Game summaries ==
=== vs. Florida State ===
Chick-fil-A Kickoff

Team	1	2	3	4	Total
No. 3 Florida State	0	7	0	0	7
• No. 1 Alabama	3	7	11	3	24

- Date: September 2
- Location: Atlanta, GA
- Game start: 8:16 p.m.
- Game attendance: 76,330
- Game weather: Indoors
- Referee: Michael Cannon
- TV announcers (ABC): Chris Fowler (play-by-play), Kirk Herbstreit (color), Maria Taylor (sidelines), Tom Rinaldi (sideline)

Scoring summary
Q1	4:30	ALA	Andy Pappanastos 35-yard field goal	ALA 3–0
Q2	13:41	FSU	Auden Tate 3-yard pass from Deondre Francois (Ricky Aguayo kick)	FSU 7–3
Q2	11:28	ALA	Calvin Ridley 53-yard pass from Jalen Hurts (Andy Pappanastos kick)	ALA 10–7
Q3	1:54	ALA	Andy Pappanastos 25-yard field goal	ALA 13–7
Q3	1:41	ALA	Damien Harris 11-yard run (Jalen Hurts pass to Calvin Ridley for two point conversion)	ALA 21–7
Q4	6:25	ALA	Andy Pappanastos 25-yard field goal	ALA 24–7

The Tide opened the season in the brand new Mercedes-Benz Stadium in Atlanta, Georgia against No. 3-ranked Florida State. Alabama came into the game with the mantra "Don't waste a failure", a reference to the disappointing loss to Clemson in the previous season's 2017 CFP National Championship game. Although having a competitive first half, the game was considered by some to fall short of preseason expectations. Furthermore, Florida State would post a disappointing 7–6 record on the year, due in part to a season ending injury to starting QB Deondre Francois in the fourth quarter, failing to deliver on much of the game's promised impact. The game for Alabama would also prove somewhat of a pyrrhic victory as linebackers Terrell Lewis and Christian Miller would be out with significant injuries, a theme that would continue to haunt the Alabama defense for the entirety of the regular season.

The first half was characterized largely as a defensive struggle for both teams. After a turnover on downs stop by the Alabama defense on fourth and 2, the offense would march down the field for a 36-yard Andy Pappanastos field goal (ALA 3 FSU 0) late in the first quarter. FSU would respond with a drive of their own culminating in a 3-yard pass to Auden Tate (ALA 3 FSU 7) which was matched by a 53-yard bomb from Alabama's Jalen Hurts to Calvin Ridley for a touchdown on Alabama's next drive (ALA 10 FSU 3). Both teams would hold the other's offense to minimal production for the rest of the half including a blocked FG attempt by FSU from Alabama's Minkah Fitzpatrick.

Florida State would open the second half with a promising drive that stalled at midfield after an Alabama sack. After a few possession exchanges, Alabama would find itself in prime position to score after a punt attempt by Florida State was blocked and recovered by Alabama deep in FSU territory. This would culminate in an Andy Pappanastos FG for 25 yards (ALA 13 FSU 7). On the ensuing kick return, Alabama's Dylan Moses would force a fumble recovered by Alabama, and on the first play of Alabama's drive, Damien Harris would score on a rushing touchdown from 11 yards out. Alabama would come away with a successful two-point conversion attempt after the touchdown to go up by two touchdowns (ALA 21 FSU 7). For the rest of the game, the Alabama defense would dominate FSU including picking off two passes by Deondre Francois. Alabama would kick one more field goal late in the game from 33 yards out (ALA 24 FSU 7) to seal the Alabama victory. The Alabama defense held the Seminoles to 40 yards rushing. Bama quarterback Jalen Hurts completed 10 of 17 passes for 96 yards and one touchdown while Damien Harris ran for 73 yards and a touchdown.

Statistics

Statistic	Florida State	Alabama
Total yards	250	269
Passing yards	210	96
Rushing yards	40	173
Penalties	4–30	5–30
Turnovers	3	0
Time of Possession	27:13	32:47

=== Fresno State ===
Team	1	2	3	4	Total
Fresno State	3	0	0	7	10
• No. 1 Alabama	14	14	3	10	41

- Date: September 9
- Location: Tuscaloosa, AL
- Game start: 2:35 p.m.
- Game attendance: 101,127
- Game weather: 79°, Wind ENE 9 mph, Clear, Sunny
- Referee: Marc Curles
- TV announcers (ESPN2): Adam Amin (play-by-play), Anthony Becht (color), Rocky Boiman (sideline)

Scoring summary
Q1	14:21	ALA	Jalen Hurts 55-yard run (Andy Pappanastos kick)	ALA 7–0
Q1	08:24	ALA	Hale Hentges 23-yard pass from Jalen Hurts (Andy Pappanastos kick)	ALA 14–0
Q1	04:03	FSU	Jimmy Camacho 27-yard field goal	ALA 14–3
Q2	14:25	ALA	Jalen Hurts 3-yard run (Andy Pappanastos kick)	ALA 14–3
Q2	01:15	ALA	Damien Harris 5-yard run (Andy Pappanastos kick)	ALA 21–3
Q3	02:03	ALA	Andy Pappanastos 24-yard field goal	ALA 31–3
Q4	07:08	ALA	Andy Pappanastos 22-yard field goal	ALA 34–3
Q4	06:06	FSU	Derrion Grim 26-yard pass from Chason Virgil (Jimmy Camacho kick)	ALA 34–10
Q4	02:41	ALA	Henry Ruggs III 16-yard pass from Tua Tagovailoa (Andy Pappanastos kick)	ALA 41–10

The Tide welcomed Fresno State to Bryant-Denny Stadium for their first home game of the season in what would be a predictable blowout of the talented Bulldogs, a team that would go on to play in the Mountain West Championship Game.

Alabama would start the game on offense to begin the first quarter. On the second play of Alabama's opening drive, QB Jalen Hurts would run for a 55-yard touchdown. Alabama would also score a touchdown on their next possession in a 23-yard Jalen Hurts pass to Hale Hentges, and again on the drive after that in a 4-yard Bo Scarbrough run as time expired on the first quarter. During this time, Fresno State would put together a respectable 70-yard drive for a field goal. (ALA 21 FRESNO 3). In the second quarter, Alabama would see a Damien Harris touchdown run from five yards out late in the second quarter while Fresno State would stall on their last possession of the half (ALA 28 FRESNO 3).

In the second half, Alabama would put together a drive which culminated in an Andy Pappanastos FG from 24 yards out in the third quarter before pulling starting QB Jalen Hurts for the backup QB and future CFP National Championship game offensive MVP Tua Tagovailoa. (ALA 31 FRESNO 3). In the fourth quarter, Tua would engineer a field goal and touchdown drive in a 16-yard pass to Henry Ruggs III for Alabama while Fresno State would find the endzone after a 63-yard punt return and 26-yard touchdown pass from QB Chason Virgil to Derrion Grim. (ALA 41 FRESNO 10). The Alabama defense held the Bulldogs to 58 yards rushing while the Tide amassed 305 yards on the ground.

Statistics

Statistic	Fresno State	Alabama
Total yards	274	497
Passing yards	216	192
Rushing yards	58	305
Penalties	1–6	4–30
Turnovers	1	0
Time of Possession	29:18	30:42

=== Colorado State ===
Team	1	2	3	4	Total
Colorado State	0	10	0	13	23
• No. 1 Alabama	17	7	14	3	41

- Date: September 16
- Location: Tuscaloosa, AL
- Game start: 6:05 p.m.
- Game attendance: 101,821
- Game weather: 83°, Partly cloudy, Wind E @ 1mph
- Referee: Matt Loeffler
- TV announcers (ESPN2): Mark Jones (play-by-play), Rod Gilmore (color), Quint Kessenich (sideline)

Scoring summary
Q1	12:43	ALA	Jalen Hurts 27-yard run (Andy Pappanastos kick)	ALA 7–0
Q1	08:56	ALA	Calvin Ridley 78-yard pass from Jalen Hurts (Andy Pappanastos kick)	ALA 14–0
Q1	05:13	ALA	Andy Pappanastos 46-yard field goal	ALA 17–0
Q2	10:34	CSU	Wyatt Bryan 27-yard field goal	ALA 17–3
Q2	02:18	CSU	Warren Jackson 4-yard pass from Nick Stevens (Wyatt Bryan kick)	ALA 17–10
Q2	01:00	ALA	Robert Foster 52-yard pass from Jalen Hurts (Andy Pappanastos kick)	ALA 24–10
Q3	07:19	ALA	Miller Forristall 12-yard pass from Jalen Hurts (Andy Pappanastos kick)	ALA 31–10
Q3	05:18	ALA	Damien Harris 5-yard run (Andy Pappanastos kick)	ALA 38–10
Q4	14:51	ALA	Andy Pappanastos 43-yard field goal	ALA 41–10
Q4	09:53	CSU	Nick Stevens 5-yard run (Wyatt Bryan kick)	ALA 41–17
Q4	01:46	CSU	Warren Jackson 3-yard pass from Nick Stevens (two-point conversion failed)	ALA 41–23

Alabama welcomed the (2–1) Colorado State Rams for the second home game of the season who were led by third year head coach Mike Bobo. Although Alabama would win convincingly, this game was marked by several momentum shifts which benefited Colorado State against the Alabama defense (lacking several key starters due to injury) early in the game and at the end of the game during garbage time. Offensively, Alabama would post a strong 487 yards, including passing and rushing touchdowns from Alabama QB Jalen Hurts. Colorado State would go on to post a winning 7–6 Record on the year and finish second in their division within the Mountain West Conference.

Alabama received the ball to start the game and would score on this drive and its next two drives. The first culminated in a Jalen Hurts 27-yard run, the second with a 78-yard touchdown pass to Calvin Ridley, and the third an Andy Pappanastos field goal from 46 yards out (ALA 17 CSU 0). Although the Alabama defense would hold CSU to no points in the first quarter, CSU would engineer two lengthy drives comprising a field goal and touchdown off strong passing proficiency from CSU QB Nick Stevens (ALA 17 CSU 10). The Alabama offense would rally though late in the second quarter wherein Jalen Hurts would find Robert Foster for a 52 passing touchdown. (ALA 24 CSU 10) to effectively end the first half.

In the second half, Nick Stevens would be picked off two times in the third quarter which Alabama would capitalize on in both situations for touchdowns, one in a Bo Scarbrough run for 9 yards for a TD and another in a Damien Harris run for 5 yards for a TD, virtually guaranteeing the Alabama win (ALA 38 CSU 10). In the fourth quarter, the Alabama defense would give up two touchdown drives while the Alabama offense, under the control of backup QB Tua Tagovailoa, would post a field goal to end the game. (ALA 41 CSU 23).

Statistics

Statistic	Colorado State	Alabama
Total yards	391	487
Passing yards	247	248
Rushing yards	144	239
Penalties	3–14	4–45
Turnovers	2	0
Time of Possession	33:53	26:07

=== at Vanderbilt ===
Team	1	2	3	4	Total
• No. 1 Alabama	21	10	21	7	59
Vanderbilt	0	0	0	0	0

- Date: September 23
- Location: Nashville, TN
- Game start: 2:39 p.m.
- Game attendance: 40,350
- Game weather: 88°, Partly Cloudy, Wind NE @ 3 mph
- Referee: Ken Williamson
- TV announcers (CBS): Brad Nessler (play-by-play), Gary Danielson (color), Allie LaForce (sideline)

Scoring summary
Q1	06:16	ALA	Bo Scarbrough 6-yard run (Andy Pappanastos kick)	ALA 7–0
Q1	03:32	ALA	Damien Harris 61-yard run (Andy Pappanastos kick)	ALA 14–0
Q1	00:42	ALA	Damien Harris 2-yard run (Andy Pappanastos kick)	ALA 21–0
Q2	09:09	ALA	Bo Scarbrough 2-yard run (Andy Pappanastos kick)	ALA 28–0
Q2	01:18	ALA	Andy Pappanastos 22-yard Field Goal	ALA 31–0
Q3	12:07	ALA	Damien Harris 2-yard run (Andy Pappanastos kick)	ALA 38–0
Q3	09:02	ALA	Jerry Jeudy 34-yard pass from Tua Tagovailoa (Andy Pappanastos kick)	ALA 45–0
Q3	05:45	ALA	DeVonta Smith 27-yard pass from Tua Tagovailoa (Andy Pappanastos kick)	ALA 52–0
Q4	13:26	ALA	Brian Robinson Jr. 17-yard run (Andy Pappanastos kick)	ALA 59–0

Alabama opened up its SEC schedule with a road game (though 75% of the stadium were Alabama fans) against a (3–0) Vanderbilt Commodores team led by 4th season head coach, Derek Mason. Vanderbilt came into the game off a ranked win over then AP ranked number 17 Kansas State of the Big 12 conference, the first time since 1946 that Vanderbilt beat an AP ranked non-SEC opponent. In addition, Vanderbilt posted a then top 20 defense and had a team return 16 starters from last season. At the end of the Kansas State game, Vanderbilt stadium erupted in chants of “We want Bama!”, a running gag of sorts within college football at the time. Vanderbilt defensive lineman Nifae Lealao was also interviewed after the Kansas State game, stating “When you come to our house, we show you how to play some SEC ball. It don’t matter where you from...Alabama, you’re next” which was republished throughout the week by various outlets in the lead up to the game. Alabama would win the game 59–0, post a school record 38 first downs and a school record margin of total offense of 599 yards (677 yards Alabama to Vanderbilt's 78).

Vanderbilt had the first possession of the game which was intercepted four plays into the drive by Alabama's Ronnie Harrison. Although Alabama would not capitalize on this turnover, on their next four possessions afterwards they would find the endzone for four rushing touchdowns. The first came off a run by Bo Scarbrough from 6 yards out, the second a 61-yard Damien Harris run, the third (off a fumble recovery forced by Anfernee Jennings) a methodical rushing drive culminating in a 2-yard Damien Harris touchdown, and the fourth another rushing drive which ended with a 2-yard rushing touchdown for Bo Scarbrough. (ALA 28 VANDY 0). Alabama would tack on one more field goal in the second quarter and Vanderbilt would be held to very minimal offensive production (ALA 31 VANDY 0).

Alabama opened the second half with a drive consisting largely of the run ending in a 2-yard rushing touchdown for Damien Harris. This drive was the last for starting QB Jalen Hurts who was 9/17 for 78 yards through the air and 48 yards on the ground. After a Vanderbilt 3 and out, Alabama backup QB Tua Tagovailoa would play for the remainder of the game, accounting for two passing touchdowns, one to Jerry Jeudy from 34 yards out and one to DeVonta Smith from 27 yards out. Alabama would tack on one more touchdown with the help of a long passing play to set up a 17-yard run from Brian Robinson Jr. (ALA 59 VANDY 0).

The shift between Hurts and Tagovailoa was marked by a dramatic shift in playcalling and offensive scheme which was representative of the strengths of each quarterback. Drives orchestrated by Hurts tended to use an offensive scheme developed by former OC Lane Kiffin: a hybrid between an option offense for running schemes and a west-coast offense characterized by running veers and horizontal passing attacks. However, the offensive scheme under Tagovailoa resembled a traditional pro-style offense, a scheme that then OC Brian Daboll favored, which emphasize pocket presence, multiple downfield reads, play-action, vertical passing, and between-the-tackles-running. This difference in playcalling would arise down the line as a major factor in Alabama's come from behind win against Georgia in the 2018 CFP National Championship Game (see Georgia below).

Statistics

Statistic	Alabama	Vanderbilt
Total yards	677	78
Passing yards	181	38
Rushing yards	496	40
Penalties	6–40	5–20
Turnovers	0	2
Time of Possession	42:55	17:05

=== Ole Miss ===
Team	1	2	3	4	Total
Ole Miss	3	0	0	0	3
• No. 1 Alabama	21	14	24	7	66

- Date: September 30
- Location: Tuscaloosa, AL
- Game start: 8:10 p.m.
- Game attendance: 101,821
- Game weather: 77°, Clear skies, Wind NNE @ 10mph
- Referee: John McDaid
- TV announcers (ESPN): Joe Tessitore (play-by-play), Todd Blackledge (color), Holly Rowe (sideline)

Scoring summary
Q1	10:04	ALA	Bo Scarbrough 6 yard run (Andy Pappanastos kick)	ALA 7–0
Q1	9:20	ALA	Levi Wallace 35 yard interception return (Andy Pappanstos kick)	ALA 14–0
Q1	5:13	ALA	Hale Hentges 3 yard pass from Jalen Hurts (Andy Pappanastos kick)	ALA 21–0
Q1	2:42	MISS	26 yard field goal by Gary Wunderlich	ALA 21–3
Q2	12:53	ALA	Josh Jacobs 18 yard pass from Jalen Hurts (Andy Pappanastos kick)	ALA 28–3
Q2	3:42	ALA	Jalen Hurts 10 yard run (Andy Pappanastos kick)	ALA 35–3
Q3	12:37	ALA	J. K. Scott 48 yard field goal	ALA 38–3
Q3	9:07	ALA	Najee Harris 4 yard run (Andy Pappanastos kick)	ALA 45–3
Q3	6:05	ALA	Tua Tagovailoa 2 yard run (Andy Pappanastos kick)	ALA 52–3
Q3	2:36	ALA	Henry Ruggs III 8 yard pass from Tua Tagovailoa (Andy Pappanastos kick)	ALA 59–3
Q4	6:51	ALA	Ronnie Clark 9 yard run (Andy Pappanastos kick)	ALA 66–3

Alabama welcomed the Ole Miss Rebels to Tuscaloosa for Alabama's first intradivisional match-up. Although Alabama was heavily favored going into this game, the recent history of this meeting was a tumultuous one for Alabama, having lost to Ole Miss in 2014 and 2015 and narrowly avoiding losing to them in 2016 (Alabama at one point trailed 24 to 3 and required a come from behind victory in the fourth quarter). However 2017 Ole Miss was coached by interim coach Matt Luke and not previous head-coach Hugh Freeze (who coached Ole Miss from 2012 through the 2016 Ole Miss seasons). This was a result of a sudden departure of Hugh Freeze during the off-season who was all but forced to resign when it came to light that, during Ole Miss' more public legal dispute between itself and former Ole Miss Head Coach Houston Nutt, a "concerning pattern" of behavior came to light wherein Ole Miss was made aware of several call logs between Hugh Freeze and a female escort service. As such, Ole Miss was in less of a position (due to off-the-field distractions) to cause Alabama trouble as it had in the past, resulting in an obliterating 66–3 Score.

In the first quarter, Alabama would find the endzone three times. Two of these scores were on offense the first being the result of favorable starting position that culminated in a 6-yard Bo Scarbrough rushing touchdown (ALA 7, MISS 0) and the second a long 85-yard drive comprising a spectacular 60-yard reception from Cam Sims that culminated in a 3-yard Hale Hentges reception. These two scores bookended an interception for a touchdown from Levi Wallace (ALA 21–3). Ole Miss would find the score board off a field goal late in the first from 26-yards out by kicker Gary Wunderlich. (ALA 21 MISS 3). The second quarter, more quiet than the first, included a Jalen Hurts pass to Josh Jacobs from 18-yards out (ALA 28 MISS 3) and another drive off a short field in two back-to-back Jalen Hurts rushes (ALA 35 MISS 3).

As Ole Miss started the game with possession, Alabama would receive the ball to start the second half which would culminate in a beautiful 48-yard kick from J. K. Scott (ALA 38 MISS 3). By this point, Ole Miss could not generate any form of offense or defense, allowing Alabama to simply pile on drive after drive, including a 4-yard Najee Harris run for a touchdown (ALA 45 MISS 3), then (after a QB exchange and off the back of a 45-yard Josh Jacobs rush) a 3-yard rush from back-up QB Tua Tagovailoa (ALA 52 MISS 3), then (off another Levi Wallace interception) an 8-yard pass from Tagovailoa to Henry Ruggs III (ALA 59 MISS 3), and finally a 91-yard drive lasting over 8 in-game minutes that culminated in a Ronnie Clark 9-yard run (ALA 66 MISS 3). This was Alabama's largest margin-of-victory since 1979. However, in line with the rest of the season, Alabama linebacker Da'Shawn Hand would be injured in the third quarter, further depleting Alabama's already sparse defensive backfield.

Statistics

Statistic	Ole Miss	Alabama
Total yards	253	613
Passing yards	165	248
Rushing yards	88	365
Penalties	3–30	7–60
Turnovers	2	0
Time of Possession	23:23	36:37

=== at Texas A&M ===
Team	1	2	3	4	Total
• No. 1 Alabama	7	10	7	3	27
Texas A&M	3	0	7	9	19

- Date: October 7
- Location: College Station, TX
- Game start: 6:20 p.m.
- Game attendance: 101.058
- Game weather: 89°, Sunny, Wind N @ 6 mph
- Referee: Matt Austin
- TV announcers (ESPN): Joe Tessitore (play-by-play), Todd Blackledge (color), Holly Rowe (sideline)

Scoring summary
Q1	9:59	TA&M	Daniel LaCamera 52 yard field goal	TA&M 3–0
Q1	9:46	ALA	Damien Harris 75 yard run (Andy Pappanastos kick)	ALA 7–3
Q2	5:41	ALA	Andy Pappanastos 34 yard field goal	ALA 10–3
Q2	3:16	ALA	Jalen Hurts 1 yard run (Andy Pappanastos kick)	ALA 17–3
Q3	11:01	ALA	Henry Ruggs III 8 yard pass from Jalen Hurts (Andy Pappanastos kick)	ALA 24–3
Q3	1:39	TA&M	Christian Kirk 2 yard pass from Kellen Mond	ALA 24–10
Q4	10:18	TA&M	Cullen Gillaspia blocks punt for safety	ALA 24–12
Q4	2:09	ALA	Andy Pappanastos 44 yard field goal	ALA 27–12
Q4	0:17	TA&M	Kellen Mond 1 yard run (Daniel LaCamera kick)	ALA 27–19

Alabama next traveled to SEC West foe Texas A&M (4–1, 2–0 SEC), and were 26.5-point favorites in the game. The game ended up being closer than expected, as Alabama pulled out a 27–19 victory.

Texas A&M took an early lead with a 52-yard field goal by Daniel LaCamera in the first quarter. On the very next offensive play for Alabama, running back Damien Harris broke off a 75-yard touchdown run. The Crimson Tide added a field goal by Andy Pappanastos and a one-yard touchdown run by Jalen Hurts in the second quarter to make the score 17–3 at the half.

Alabama's opening drive of the second half was a nine-play, 75-yard drive that ended with an eight-yard touchdown pass from Hurts to Henry Ruggs III. On their next drive, Alabama's Robert Foster fumbled the ball, which the Aggies recovered on the Alabama 36 yard line. Texas A&M took advantage of the opportunity and scored via a two-yard touchdown pass from Kellen Mond to Christian Kirk. Texas A&M's next drive ended with an interception by Minkah Fitzpatrick near Alabama's goal line. Four plays later, Alabama was forced to punt out of their own end zone, and the kick was blocked for a safety, after which the score was 24–12 Alabama. Alabama kicked a 44-yard field goal with 2:09 left to play, and then Texas A&M led a touchdown drive in the final minutes that ended with a one-yard Kellen Mond touchdown run to make the score 27–19 with 17 seconds remaining. The Aggies failed to convert an onside kick and Alabama ran out the clock to end the game. Damien Harris finished with 124 yards and a touchdown in the game.

Statistics

Statistic	Alabama	Texas A&M
Total yards	355	308
Passing yards	123	237
Rushing yards	232	71
Penalties	6–50	6–45
Turnovers	1	3
Time of Possession	27:32	32:28

=== Arkansas ===
Team	1	2	3	4	Total
Arkansas	0	0	3	6	9
• No. 1 Alabama	17	7	7	10	41

- Date: October 14
- Location: Tuscaloosa, AL
- Game start: 6:20 p.m.
- Game attendance: 101,821
- Game weather: 76°, Cloudy, Wind E @ 5 mph
- Referee: Ken Williamson
- TV announcers (ESPN): Chris Fowler (play-by-play), Kirk Herbstreit (color), Maria Taylor (sideline)

Scoring summary
Q1	14:45	ALA	Damien Harris 75 yard run (Andy Pappanastos kick)	ALA 7–0
Q1	11:36	ALA	Andy Pappanastos 39 yard field goal	ALA 10–0
Q1	7:24	ALA	Damien Harris 4 yard run (Andy Pappanastos kick)	ALA 17–0
Q2	1:20	ALA	Jalen Hurts 11 yard run (Andy Pappanastos kick)	ALA 24–0
Q3	4:16	ARK	Connor Limpert 30 yard field goal	ALA 24–3
Q3	1:25	ALA	Henry Ruggs III 20 yard pass from Jalen Hurts (Andy Pappanastos kick)	ALA 31–3
Q4	12:29	ALA	Najee Harris 4 yard run (Andy Pappanastos kick)	ALA 38–3
Q4	8:55	ALA	Andy Pappanastos 21 yard field goal	ALA 41–3
Q4	3:03	ARK	Jordan Jones 3 yard pass from Cole Kelley (Connor Limpert PAT missed)	ALA 41–9

Alabama next hosted SEC West foe Arkansas, who was 2–3 (0–2 SEC) at the time of the game. The Crimson Tide won in a blowout, 41–9.

On the very first offensive play of the game, Alabama's Damien Harris ran for a 75-yard touchdown. Arkansas's first drive resulted in a three-and-out followed by a fumbled snap by the punter, resulting in a turnover on downs at the Arkansas 25. Alabama answered with a 39-yard field goal. After another Arkansas three-and-out, Alabama completed a 65-yard drive that ended with a four-yard score by Damien Harris, after which the score was 17–0 midway through the first quarter. Alabama struggled to move the ball for their next few drives, but scored again in the final two minutes of the half via an 11-yard touchdown run by Jalen Hurts, and the score was 24–0 at halftime.

Alabama's first drive in the second half ended with a Jalen Hurts interception to Arkansas's Kevin Richardson II, after which Arkansas scored their first points of the day via a 30-yard field goal. Hurts responded with a 20-yard touchdown pass to Henry Ruggs III on the next drive. Alabama's first drive of the fourth quarter ended with a four-yard touchdown run by freshman Najee Harris. Arkansas's first touchdown came with 3:03 left to go via a three-yard touchdown pass from Cole Kelley to Jordan Jones, after which Alabama ran out with the clock with a final score of 41–9. Damien Harris finished with 125 yards and two touchdowns on just nine carries in the game.

Statistics

Statistic	Arkansas	Alabama
Total yards	227	496
Passing yards	200	188
Rushing yards	27	308
Penalties	5–25	6–66
Turnovers	1	2
Time of Possession	29:33	30:27

=== Tennessee ===
Third Saturday of October

Team	1	2	3	4	Total
Tennessee	0	0	7	0	7
• No. 1 Alabama	7	14	10	14	45

- Date: October 21
- Location: Tuscaloosa, AL
- Game start: 2:39 p.m.
- Game attendance: 101,821
- Game weather: 81°, Mostly Sunny, Wind SE @ 11 mph
- Referee: Marc Curles
- TV announcers (CBS): Brad Nessler (play-by-play), Gary Danielson (color), Allie LaForce (sideline)

Scoring summary
Q1	8:21	ALA	Bo Scarbrough 1 yard run (Andy Pappanastos kick)	ALA 7–0
Q2	4:48	ALA	Bo Scarbrough 1 yard run (Andy Pappanastos kick)	ALA 14–0
Q2	1:18	ALA	Damien Harris 11 yard run (Andy Pappanastos kick)	ALA 21–0
Q3	12:39	ALA	Irv Smith Jr. 14 yard pass from Jalen Hurts	ALA 28–0
Q3	6:03	TENN	Daniel Bituli 97 yard interception return (Brent Cimaglia kick)	ALA 28–7
Q3	3:13	ALA	Andy Pappanastos 25 yard field goal	ALA 31–7
Q4	12:59	ALA	Tua Tagovailoa 23 yard run (Andy Pappanastos kick)	ALA 38–7
Q4	4:49	ALA	Henry Ruggs III 60 yard pass from Tua Tagovailoa (Andy Pappanastos kick)	ALA 45–7

Alabama next hosted its protected East Division rival Tennessee. Alabama won in a blowout, 45–7, their 11th straight win in the series.

Tennessee received the opening kickoff but was forced to punt after three plays. Alabama's first drive was a 12-play, 63-yard drive that ended in a one-yard touchdown run by Bo Scarbrough. In the second quarter, an 85-yard drive ended in another one-yard score by Scarbrough, and with 1:18 remaining in the half, Damien Harris capped a 77-yard drive with an 11-yard touchdown run. The score was 21–0 at halftime.

Alabama's opening drive of the second half ended with a 14-yard touchdown pass from Jalen Hurts to Irv Smith Jr. Tua Tagovailoa came in at quarterback and led a drive down to the Tennessee 5 yard line, but Tennessee's Daniel Bituli intercepted a pass and returned it for a 97-yard score for Tennessee's only points on the day. Tagovailoa added a 23-yard rushing touchdown and a 60-yard passing touchdown to Henry Ruggs III before the end of the game to make the score 45–7 at the final horn. Alabama out-gained Tennessee 604 to 108 in total yards on the day.

Statistics

Statistic	Tennessee	Alabama
Total yards	108	604
Passing yards	44	332
Rushing yards	64	272
Penalties	9–81	7–56
Turnovers	2	1
Time of Possession	25:09	34:51

=== LSU ===
Team	1	2	3	4	Total
No. 18 LSU	0	3	7	0	10
• No. 1 Alabama	7	7	7	3	24

- Date: November 4
- Location: Tuscaloosa, AL
- Game start: 7:10 p.m.
- Game attendance: 101,821
- Game weather: 69°, Partly Cloudy, Wind S @ 1 mph
- Referee: John McDaid
- TV announcers (CBS): Brad Nessler (play-by-play), Gary Danielson (color), Allie LaForce (sideline)

Scoring summary
Q1	6:08	ALA	Irv Smith Jr. 4 yard pass from Jalen Hurts (Andy Pappanastos kick)	ALA 7–0
Q2	14:17	ALA	Bo Scarbrough 9 yard run (Andy Pappanastos kick)	ALA 14–0
Q2	8:38	LSU	Connor Culp 21 yard field goal	ALA 14–3
Q3	2:55	ALA	Jalen Hurts 3 yard run (Andy Pappanastos kick)	ALA 21–3
Q3	1:48	LSU	Darrel Williams 2 yard run (Connor Culp kick)	ALA 21–10
Q4	13:25	ALA	Andy Pappanastos 40 yard field goal	ALA 24–10

Alabama next faced their second ranked opponent of the year in a home game against SEC West foe No. 18 LSU. In a low-scoring game for the Tide, Alabama led by two scores for most of the game and won by a score of 24–10.

Alabama got on the board first after a 90-yard drive ended with a four-yard touchdown pass from Jalen Hurts to Irv Smith Jr. Late in the first quarter, Alabama safety Ronnie Harrison intercepted a pass from LSU's Danny Etling at the LSU 37, after which Bo Scarbrough ran for a nine-yard touchdown run to make the score 14–0. LSU's next drive moved the ball to the Alabama 4 yard line but the Tigers settled for a 21-yard field goal. The score was 14–3 at halftime.

The teams struggled to move the ball at the start of the second half, until Jalen Hurts capped a 56-yard drive with a three-yard touchdown run late in the third quarter. LSU responded with their own touchdown drive, in which Darrel Williams ran for a 54-yard run to the Alabama 2 yard line and ran in for the score two plays later. Alabama's Andy Pappanastos kicked a 40-yard field goal to make the score 24–10 with 13:25 left to play. The Alabama defense was the story for the rest of the game, as LSU accumulated only 24 yards on three drives in the final 13 minutes, while the Alabama offense did not score.

Statistics

Statistic	LSU	Alabama
Total yards	306	299
Passing yards	155	183
Rushing yards	151	116
Penalties	5–30	1–11
Turnovers	1	0
Time of Possession	34:07	25:53

=== at Mississippi State ===
Team	1	2	3	4	Total
• No. 1 Alabama	7	7	3	14	31
No. 19 Mississippi State	7	7	7	3	24

- Date: November 11
- Location: Starkville, MS
- Game start: 6:01 p.m.
- Game attendance: 61,344
- Game weather: 54°, Clear Skies, Wind ESE @ 2 mph
- Referee: Ken Williamson
- TV announcers (ESPN): Dave Pasch (play-by-play), Greg McElroy (color), Tom Luginbill (sideline)

Scoring summary
Q1	3:37	MSST	Aeris Williams 11 yard run (Jace Christmann kick)	MSST 7–0
Q1	1:43	ALA	Jalen Hurts 1 yard run (Andy Pappanastos kick)	TIED 7–7
Q2	10:39	MSST	Aeris Williams 5 yard run (Jace Christmann kick)	MSST 14–7
Q2	9:26	ALA	Josh Jacobs 1 yard run (Andy Pappanastos kick)	TIED 14–14
Q3	12:41	ALA	Andy Pappanastos 30 yard field goal	ALA 17–14
Q3	6:03	MSST	Nick Fitzgerald 2 yard run (Jace Christmann kick)	MSST 21–17
Q4	14:13	MSST	Jace Christmann 25 yard field goal	MSST 24–17
Q4	9:49	ALA	Damien Harris 14 yard run (Andy Pappanastos kick)	TIED 24–24
Q4	0:25	ALA	DeVonta Smith 26 yard pass from Jalen Hurts (Andy Pappanastos kick)	ALA 31–24

After defeating LSU, Alabama traveled to play No. 19 Mississippi State. Alabama pulled ahead late to secure a 31–24 victory.

Mississippi State opened the scoring with an 11-yard touchdown run from Aeris Williams on their second drive. Alabama responded with a 65-yard drive that included a 63-yard pass from Jalen Hurts to Calvin Ridley and ended with a one-yard touchdown run from Hurts. Mississippi State's next drive again ended with an Aeris Williams touchdown run, this time from five yards out. Once again, Alabama responded with a touchdown drive, as Hurts connected with Ridley again for a 61-yard pass and Josh Jacobs ended the drive with a one-yard run. Both teams failed to score for the last nine minutes of the half, and the 14–14 score carried into halftime.

Alabama received the second half kickoff and advanced to the Mississippi State 12 yard line but settled for a 30-yard field goal from Andy Pappanastos. The Bulldogs then went on a 13-play, 69-yard drive that ended with a two-yard touchdown run by quarterback Nick Fitzgerald to take the lead. The Bulldogs extended their lead to seven points early in the fourth quarter with a 25-yard field goal. Alabama tied the game with a 14-yard touchdown run by Damien Harris with 9:49 left to go. A would-be go-ahead 41-yard field goal from Alabama missed with 2:03 left to go, but Alabama forced a Mississippi State three-and-out and got the ball back with 1:01 left on the clock. Jalen Hurts marched the team down the field and scored the go-ahead touchdown via a 26-yard pass to DeVonta Smith with 25 seconds left. Mississippi State attempted a Hail Mary pass as time expired, but the pass sailed out of the endzone and the game ended at 31–24 Alabama.

Statistics

Statistic	Alabama	Mississippi State
Total yards	444	330
Passing yards	242	158
Rushing yards	202	172
Penalties	5–60	4–30
Turnovers	0	0
Time of Possession	21:04	38:56

=== Mercer ===
Team	1	2	3	4	Total
Mercer	0	0	0	0	0
• No. 1 Alabama	14	21	14	7	56

- Date: November 18
- Location: Tuscaloosa, AL
- Game start: 11:01 a.m.
- Game attendance: 101,821
- Game weather: 71°, Cloudy skies, Wind S @ 11 mph
- Referee: Lee Hedrick
- TV announcers (SEC Network): Tom Hart (play-by-play), Jordan Rodgers (color), Cole Cubelic (sideline)

Scoring summary
Q1	11:27	ALA	Irv Smith Jr. 8 yard pass from Jalen Hurts (J. K. Scott kick)	ALA 7–0
Q1	6:35	ALA	Najee Harris 3 yard run (J. K. Scott kick)	ALA 14–0
Q2	14:49	ALA	Calvin Ridley 66 yard pass from Jalen Hurts (J. K. Scott)	ALA 21–0
Q2	13:26	ALA	Josh Jacobs 7 yard pass from Jalen Hurts (J. K. Scott kick)	ALA 28–0
Q2	10:39	ALA	Hale Hentges 4 yard pass from Tua Tagovailoa (J. K. Scott kick)	ALA 35–0
Q3	4:18	ALA	Cam Sims 8 yard pass from Tua Tagovailoa (J. K. Scott kick)	ALA 42–0
Q3	3:06	ALA	Brian Robinson 6 yard run (J. K. Scott kick)	ALA 49–0
Q4	14:55	ALA	Derek Kief 13 yard pass from Tua Tagovailoa (J. K. Scott kick)	ALA 56–0

Alabama next returned home for their final non-conference game against FCS opponent Mercer. Alabama won in a predictable blowout, 56–0.

Alabama's first five possessions of the first half all ended with touchdowns. The first came from an eight-yard pass from Jalen Hurts to Irv Smith Jr., followed by a three-yard score by Najee Harris. Hurts threw two more touchdown passes in the first half via a 66-yard pass to Calvin Ridley and a seven-yard pass to Josh Jacobs. Tua Tagovailoa threw a four-yard touchdown pass to Hale Hentges in the second quarter. In the second half, Alabama was forced to punt once before rattling off three more touchdown drives with mostly backups on the field to bring the score to 56–0.

Statistics

Statistic	Mercer	Alabama
Total yards	161	530
Passing yards	54	265
Rushing yards	107	265
Penalties	2–10	1–5
Turnovers	3	2
Time of Possession	34:48	25:12

=== at Auburn ===
Iron Bowl

Team	1	2	3	4	Total
No. 1 Alabama	0	7	7	0	14
• No. 6 Auburn	7	3	10	6	26

- Date: November 25
- Location: Auburn, AL
- Game start: 2:41 p.m.
- Game attendance: 87,451
- Game weather: 63°, Mostly Cloudy, Wind W @ 6 mph
- Referee: Matt Loeffler
- TV announcers (CBS): Brad Nessler (play-by-play), Gary Danielson (color), Allie LaForce (sideline)

Scoring summary
Q1	4:38	AUB	Nate Craig-Myers 3 yard pass from Kerryon Johnson (Daniel Carlson kick)	AUB 7–0
Q2	8:31	ALA	Jerry Jeudy 36 yard pass from Jalen Hurts (Andy Pappanastos kick)	TIED 7–7
2Q	0:00	AUB	Daniel Carlson 33 yard field goal	AUB 10–7
3Q	13:22	ALA	Bo Scarbrough 21 yard run (Andy Pappanastos kick)	ALA 14–10
Q3	10:12	AUB	Daniel Carlson 44 yard field goal	ALA 14–13
Q3	3:02	AUB	Kerryon Johnson 1 yard run (Daniel Carlson kick)	AUB 20–14
Q4	12:49	AUB	Jarrett Stidham 16 yard run (two point conversion failed)	AUB 26–14

In the final game of the regular season, Alabama traveled to play in-state rival No. 6 Auburn in the 82nd Iron Bowl. Two weeks earlier, Auburn had defeated then-No. 2 Georgia at home, and could claim the West Division title with another home win against the top-ranked Crimson Tide. Auburn did just that, pulling off the 26–14 victory. It was Auburn's first win in the rivalry since upsetting top-ranked Alabama in 2013 in a game known as the Kick Six.

In Auburn's second drive of the game, the Tigers led a 12-play, 95-yard drive that ended with a three-yard touchdown pass from running back Kerryon Johnson to Nate Craig-Myers. Alabama's next drive ended with a fumble by Jalen Hurts. Auburn got as far as the Alabama 4 yard line but quarterback Jarrett Stidham fumbled the ball as well. Two drives later, Alabama tied the game with a 36-yard pass from Jalen Hurts to Jerry Jeudy. Auburn kicked a 33-yard field goal as time expired in the second quarter to make the score 10–7 Auburn at halftime.

Alabama received the second half kickoff and took the lead with a 21-yard touchdown run by Bo Scarbrough. Auburn was able to score on its next two drives via a 44-yard field goal and then a one-yard touchdown run by Kerryon Johnson, making the score 20–14 Auburn. Alabama's next drive ended with a botched field goal snap and a turnover on downs. Auburn then extended their lead early in the fourth quarter with a 16-yard touchdown run by Jarrett Stidham. Auburn failed on the two-point attempt, and the score was 26–14. Alabama's next two drives were both lengthy but ended with failed fourth down attempts and turnovers on downs. Auburn got the ball with 2:21 left to go and was able to wind down the clock to win the game.

Statistics

Statistic	Alabama	Auburn
Total yards	314	408
Passing yards	103	240
Rushing yards	211	168
Penalties	9–65	4–40
Turnovers	1	1
Time of Possession	23:58	36:02

=== vs. Clemson (Sugar Bowl) ===
Allstate Sugar Bowl- CFP Semifinal

Team	1	2	3	4	Total
• No. 4 Alabama	10	0	14	0	24
No. 1 Clemson	0	3	3	0	6

- Date: January 1, 2018
- Location: New Orleans, LA
- Game start: 8:01 p.m.
- Game attendance: 72,360
- Game weather: Indoors
- Referee: Land Clark
- TV announcers (ESPN): Joe Tessitore (play-by-play), Todd Blackledge (color), Holly Rowe (sideline) and Laura Rutledge (Sideline)

Scoring summary
Q1	5:23	ALA	Andy Pappanastos 24 yard field goal	ALA 3–0
Q1	0:12	ALA	Calvin Ridley 12 yard pass from Jalen Hurts (Andy Pappanastos kick)	ALA 10–0
Q2	10:00	CLEM	Alex Spence 44 yard field goal	ALA 10–3
Q3	12:45	CLEM	Alex Spence 42 yard field goal	ALA 10–6
Q3	5:40	ALA	Daron Payne 1 yard pass from Jalen Hurts (Andy Pappanastos kick)	ALA 17–6
Q3	5:27	ALA	Mack Wilson 18 yard interception return (Andy Pappanastos kick)	ALA 24–6

During the Final Selection Day by the College Football Playoff committee held on December 3, 2017, Alabama was selected over the only other serious contenders, the Ohio State Buckeyes and the Wisconsin Badgers, for inclusion in the CFP at number 4. This decision was controversial for some media outlets and commentators. Wisconsin was 12-0 heading into the Big Ten Championship and had a Playoff spot locked up if they were to win, but they lost 27–21 to Ohio State, who was 10–2. Neither the Buckeyes nor the Badgers would receive the 4th Playoff spot, as Ohio State had 2 losses (including a 55-24 drubbing by Iowa) and Wisconsin had a weak strength of schedule compared to other Playoff contenders.

Going into the game Alabama was looking to avenge losing on the last play of the game during the 2016 College Football National Championship Game against Clemson and to prove they belonged in the CFP after their controversial inclusion. At the beginning of the game, Alabama won the coin toss and elected to defer their choice to the second half. The game was marked throughout the game by strong defensive performances by both Clemson and a healthy, rejuvenated Alabama defense. During the middle of the first quarter, Alabama had an opportunity in the red zone stalled and settled for a 24-yard field goal from kicker Andy Pappanastos (AL 3 – CLEM 0). After another 3 and out by Clemson, Alabama would, with great field position, drive down the field which culminated in a 12-yard pass from QB Jalen Hurts to Calvin Ridley (AL 10 – CLEM 0). Clemson, however would respond in the second quarter with a drive which ended with a 44-yard FG from Clemson kicker Alex Spence(AL 10 – CLEM 3). Defensive performances by both teams would keep this score the same going into the half.

In the second half, Alabama would receive the ball but uncharacteristically fumbled deep in their own territory on a muffed handoff between QB Jalen Hurts and RB Damien Harris. A strong Alabama defensive response would limit this turnover to a 42-yard Alex Spence FG (AL 10 – CLEM 6). After an Alabama three and out, a promising Clemson drive would be cut short when Clemson QB Kelly Bryant was tackled as he threw the ball causing it to wobble into the arms of Alabama defensive tackle Daron Payne for an interception. Alabama would capitalize on this momentum with a drive into the Clemson redzone, where, on second and goal, Alabama would bring in their goal line set which includes Payne as a downhill blocker fullback. However, instead of running Payne up the middle, he would roll out for a 1-yard reception from Jalen Hurts (AL 17- CLEM 6) in what is affectionately known as a "big man touchdown". On the first play of Clemson's next drive, Kelly Bryant's intended pass to Deon Cain was deflected by Alabama's Levi Wallace into the arms of Mack Wilson for an interception returned for a touchdown (ALA 24 CLEM 6). The Alabama defense would control Clemson for the remainder of the 3rd and 4th quarter, ending the game (ALA 24 CLEM 6).

Statistics

Statistic	Alabama	Clemson
Total yards	261	188
Passing yards	120	124
Rushing yards	141	64
Penalties	2–10	4–29
Turnovers	1	2
Time of Possession	32:11	27:49

=== vs. Georgia (CFP National Championship) ===
CFP National Championship

Team	1	2	3	4	OT	Total
• No. 4 Alabama	0	0	10	10	6	26
No. 3 Georgia	0	13	7	0	3	23

- Date: January 8, 2018
- Location: Atlanta, GA
- Game start: 8:19 p.m.
- Game attendance: 77,430
- Game weather: Indoors
- Referee: Dan Capron
- TV announcers (ESPN): Chris Fowler (play-by-play), Kirk Herbstreit (color), Maria Taylor & Tom Rinaldi (sideline)

Scoring summary
2Q	14:14	UGA	Rodrigo Blankenship 41 yard field goal	UGA 3–0
2Q	7:33	UGA	Rodrigo Blankenship 27 yard field goal	UGA 6–0
2Q	0:07	UGA	Mecole Hardman 1 yard run (Rodrigo Blankenship kick)	UGA 13–0
Q3	8:52	ALA	Henry Ruggs III 6 yard pass from Tua Tagovailoa (Andy Pappanastos kick)	UGA 13–7
Q3	6:52	UGA	Mecole Hardman 80 yard pass from Jake Fromm (Rodrigo Blankenship kick)	UGA 20–7
Q3	5:15	ALA	Andy Pappanastos 43 yard field goal	UGA 20–10
Q4	9:24	ALA	Andy Pappanastos 30 yard field goal	UGA 20–13
Q4	3:49	ALA	Calvin Ridley 7 yard pass from Tua Tagovailoa (Andy Pappanastos kick)	TIED 20–20
OT		UGA	Rodrigo Blankenship 51 yard field goal	UGA 23–20
OT		ALA	DeVonta Smith 41 yard pass from Tua Tagovailoa	ALA 26–23

After Alabama's win in the CFP Semi-final in the Sugar Bowl over Clemson and Georgia's overtime win over Oklahoma in the Rose Bowl, Alabama and Georgia, who did not play during SEC play, were slated to play on January 8, 2018, in the Mercedes-Benz Dome in Atlanta, Georgia for the 2018 College Football National Championship Game. This game marked the first time ex-Defensive Coordinator for Alabama Kirby Smart, head coach of Georgia faced off against his mentor Nick Saban.

Alabama won the coin toss and elected to defer. On Georgia's opening drive, Alabama's Tony Brown intercepted a pass intended for Georgia's Riley Ridley, the younger brother of Alabama's Calvin Ridley. Alabama used this momentum to get Andy Pappanastos in a position for a 40-yard field goal, which he shanked badly to the left. This was Alabama's only meaningful offensive production for the entire half. On the Georgia side, Georgia QB Jake Fromm utilized a very effective balanced offensive to stress an increasingly exhausted Alabama defense (due to a combination of abysmal offensive production by Alabama and excellent, preternatural play from the Georgia offense). During the middle of the first quarter, on third and 20, the Alabama defense were gashed by Georgia's Sony Michel for 26 yards to get within field goal range. The Alabama defense tightened up and held Georgia to a completed 41-yard field goal from Georgia's Rodrigo Blankenship (AL 0 GA 3). After another Alabama three and out, Georgia again marched down the field to the Alabama red zone. Again, Alabama held Georgia to a field goal, this time from 27 yards (AL 0 GA 6). Alabama and Georgia traded minimal drives until Georgia gained possession of the ball with 1:12 left in the half. On this drive, which included a strong QB run from Jake Fromm, Georgia ultimately capitalized on a tired and frustrated Alabama defense with a 1-yard touchdown run by Georgia Mecole Hardman (AL 0 GA 13). Alabama took a knee to end the half.

Alabama received the ball to start the half, with one significant modification of personnel: benching two-year starting QB Jalen Hurts for true freshman Hawaiian phenom Tua Tagovailoa. Though Alabama did not see an immediate benefit—their first drive going for a three and out—Tua almost single-handedly resurrected a rudderless Alabama offense.

After holding Georgia to a three and out, a reinvigorated Alabama offense faced a third down and 7 near midfield. Tua eluded four unblocked defenders in the backfield and ran for an Alabama first down. Capturing the momentum, Alabama sealed the drive with a 6-yard strike from Tua to Henry Ruggs III (AL 7 GA 13). Four plays into Georgia's next drive, on third and long, Fromm threw an 80-yard pass to Mecole Hardman for a touchdown (AL 7 GA 20), negating Alabama's gain. Worse yet for Alabama, on its next possession, Tua was picked off deep in Alabama territory on an ill-advised pass. At the brink of collapse, Alabama received a godsend on the very next play in a deflected Jake Fromm pass for an Alabama interception by Raekwon Davis. Using this sudden turnover, Alabama drove into field goal range with a 43-yard Andy Pappanastos field goal (AL 10 GA 20). Alabama and Georgia traded minimal drives to end the third quarter. On Georgia's first drive of the fourth quarter, the beleaguered Alabama defense once more stood tall and allowed Alabama to get the ball back. During Alabama's first drive of the fourth quarter, another freshman phenom, RB Najee Harris, put the Alabama offense in position for another completed FG, this time from 30 yards (AL 13 GA 20). After stopping Georgia on its next possession, Alabama again drove down the field. On fourth down and 4, deep in Georgia territory, Alabama elected to go for the touchdown instead of kicking another field goal. Tua's pass was completed into triple coverage to Calvin Ridley for a 7-yard touchdown (AL 20 GA 20). The exhausted Alabama defense proved once again their mettle and held Georgia to a three and out. In prime position with 2:50 left in the game, Alabama drove down the field and set up a potentially game-winning field goal with three seconds left on the clock. However, reminiscent of his first kick of the game, Andy Pappanastos, missed wide left from 36 yards out, sending the game into overtime.

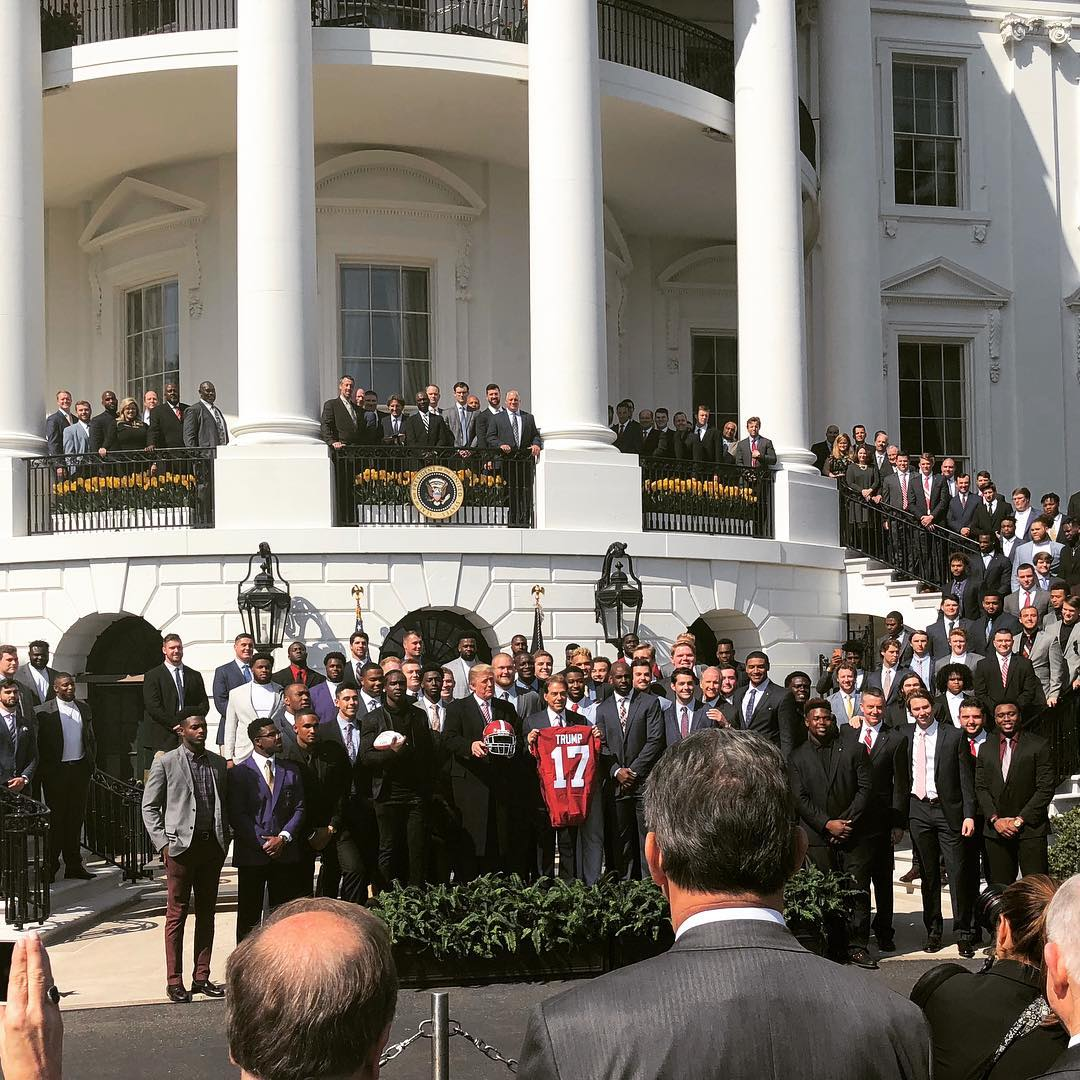
2017 Alabama Crimson Tide with Donald Trump at the White House in 2018.

In overtime, Alabama again won the coin toss and elected to play defense. For the last time, the Alabama defense stood tall with a Terrell Lewis sack of Jake Fromm for a 13-yard loss. Despite the distance, a stellar 51-yard kick for from Rodrigo Blankenship put Georgia up. (AL 20 GA 23). On Alabama's first play of their drive, Tua, showing his inexperience, attempted to outmaneuver two unblocked defenders in the backfield instead of throwing the ball away, putting Alabama back 16 yards. With everything on the line, instead of trying to get some of the yards back, Alabama elected to run what it calls "Seattle," a play designed for long passes. Tua, recognizing Cover 2 in the back, shifted the safety as far to the middle of the field as he could with his eyes, and then immediately threw a pass to freshman DeVonta Smith for 41 yards and the game-winning touchdown (AL 26 – GA 23). This was Alabama's 17th claimed national championship, 11th AP National Championship, and fifth in nine years for Head Coach Nick Saban.

Statistics

Statistic	Alabama	Georgia
Total yards	371	365
Passing yards	187	232
Rushing yards	184	133
Penalties	6–41	6–65
Turnovers	1	2
Time of possession	26:17	33:43

== Rankings ==
Ranking movements Legend: ██ Increase in ranking ██ Decrease in ranking ( ) = First-place votes
	Week															
Poll	Pre	1	2	3	4	5	6	7	8	9	10	11	12	13	14	Final
AP	1 (52)	1 (60)	1 (58)	1 (45)	1 (52)	1 (44)	1 (43)	1 (61)	1 (61)	1 (59)	1 (56)	1 (57)	1 (58)	5	4	1 (57)
Coaches	1 (49)	1 (60)	1 (58)	1 (59)	1 (59)	1 (59)	1 (57)	1 (63)	1 (64)	1 (65)	1 (64)	1 (63)	1 (63)	5	4	1 (62)
CFP	Not released									2	2	1	1	5	4	Not released

== Coaching staff ==
Name	Position	Consecutive season at Alabama in current position
Nick Saban	Head coach	11th
Burton Burns	Associate head coach and running backs coach	11th
Tosh Lupoi	Co-defensive coordinator and outside linebackers coach	(1st as DC) 3rd
Jeremy Pruitt	Defensive coordinator and inside linebackers coach	2nd
Mike Locksley	Co-offensive coordinator and wide receivers coach	(1st as OC) 2nd
Brian Daboll	Offensive coordinator and quarterbacks coach	1st
Joe Pannunzio	Tight end coach and special teams coordinator	1st
Derrick Ansley	Defensive backs	2nd
Karl Dunbar	Defensive line coach	2nd
Brent Key	Offensive line	2nd
Scott Cochran	Strength and conditioning	10th

Graduate Assistant

- Mike Miller
- Nick Perry
- Kyle Pope

Analysts

- William Vlachos
- Wes Neighbors
- Chris Weinke
- Shea Tierney
- Garrett Cox
- Dean Altobelli
- Brendan Farrell
- Rob Ezell
- Alex Mortensen
- Dan Werner
- Brian Niedermeyer
- Freddie Roach

== Roster ==
2017 Alabama Crimson Tide Football
Quarterback: 2 Jalen Hurts – sophomore (6'2, 210); 10 Mac Jones – freshman (6'2, 180); 13 Tua Tagovailoa – freshman (6'1, 215); 16 Kyle Edwards – sophomore (6'1, 206); 18 Montana Murphy – sophomore (6'3, 201); 18 Austin Johnson – senior (6'2, 202); Running back: 8 Josh Jacobs – sophomore (5'10, 200); 9 Bo Scarbrough – (redshirt) junior (6'2, 230); 22 Najee Harris – freshman (6'3, 226); 24 Brian Robinson Jr. – freshman (6'1, 224); 34 Damien Harris – junior (5'11, 214); Wide receiver: 1 Robert Foster – (redshirt) senior (6'2, 191); 3 Calvin Ridley – junior (6'1, 188); 4 Jerry Jeudy – freshman (6'1, 175); 6 DeVonta Smith – freshman (6'1, 160); 11 Henry Ruggs – freshman (6'0, 175); 12 Chadarius Townsend – freshman (6'0, 192); 14 Tyrell Shavers – freshman (6'6, 202); 17 Cam Sims – senior (6'5, 206); 19 Xavian Marks – sophomore (5'8, 163); 30 Daniel Skehan – senior (6'0, 201); 32 Swade Hutchinson – senior (6'3, 189); 36 Mac Hereford – sophomore (6'2, 215); 37 Jonathan Rice – junior (6'4, 207); 41 Chris Herring – sophomore (6'4, 170); 81 Derek Kief – (redshirt) junior (6'4, 200); Placekicker: 12 Andy Pappanastos – (redshirt) senior (5'11, 198); 97 Joseph Bulovas – freshman (6'0, 205); Punter: 10 J. K. Scott – senior (6'5, 198); 96 Brannon Satterfield – junior (6'2, 210); 97 Mike Bernier – junior (6'2, 205); 98 Preston Knight – sophomore (6'5, 200)	Tight end: 5 Ronnie Clark – (redshirt) junior (6'2, 217); 40 Giles Amos – sophomore (6'4, 236); 42 Jacob Parker – senior (6'1, 224); 44 Kedrick James – freshman (6'5, 245); 45 Hunter Bryant – senior (6'5, 226); 46 Joseph Harvey – senior (5'9, 211); 48 Sean Goodman – sophomore (6'1, 234); 82 Irv Smith Jr. – sophomore (6'4, 235); 83 Cam Stewart – sophomore (6'8, 254); 84 Hale Hentges – junior (6'5, 256); 87 Miller Forristall– sophomore (6'5, 220); 88 Major Tennison – freshman (6'5, 244); Offensive Lineman: 50 Hunter Brannon – freshman (6'4, 290); 56 Brandon Kennedy – (redshirt) freshman (6'3, 302); 59 Dallas Warmack – junior (6'2, 299); 60 Kendall Randolph – freshman (6'5, 285); 63 J. C. Hassenauer – senior (6'2, 297); 65 Deonte Brown – (redshirt) freshman (6'4, 350); 66 Lester Cotton – junior (6'4, 319); 67 Josh Casher – (redshirt) junior (6'1, 284); 70 Alex Leatherwood – freshman (6'6, 327); 71 Ross Pierschbacher – (redshirt) junior (6'4, 304); 72 Richie Petitbon – (redshirt) sophomore (6'4, 300); 73 Jonah Williams – sophomore (6'5, 280); 74 Jedrick Wills – freshman (6'5, 315); 75 Bradley Bozeman – (redshirt) senior (6'5, 312); 76 Scott Lashley – (redshirt) freshman (6'7, 325); 77 Matt Womack – (redshirt) sophomore (6'7, 320); 78 Elliot Baker – junior (6'7, 297); 79 Chris Owens – (redshirt) freshman (6'3, 307); Defensive Lineman: 9 Da'Shawn Hand – senior (6'4, 278); 49 Isaiah Buggs – junior (6'5, 292); 50 Vohn Keith Jr. – senior (6'2, 248); 58 Daniel Powell – sophomore (5'11, 238); 68 Taylor Wilson – sophomore (6'0, 274); 69 Joshua Frazier – senior (6'4, 315); 89 LaBryan Ray – freshman (6'5, 270); 90 Jamar King – senior (6'4, 290); 92 Quinnen Williams – (redshirt) freshman (6'4, 265); 93 Phidarian Mathis – freshman (6'4, 287); 94 Daron Payne – junior (6'2, 319); 95 Johnny Dwight – (redshirt) sophomore (6'3, 306); 99 Raekwon Davis – sophomore (6'7, 325)	Linebacker: 1 Ben Davis – (redshirt) freshman (6'4, 240); 4 Christopher Allen – freshman (6'5, 234); 16 Jamey Mosley – (redshirt) junior (6'5, 226); 18 Dylan Moses – freshman (6'3, 234); 20 Shaun Dion Hamilton – senior (6'0, 232); 23 Jarez Parks – freshman (6'3, 253); 24 Terrell Lewis – sophomore (6'5, 245); 30 Mack Wilson – sophomore (6'2, 240); 32 Rashaan Evans – senior (6'3, 230); 33 Anfernee Jennings – (redshirt) sophomore (6'3, 268); 36 Markail Benton – freshman (6'2, 237); 40 Joshua McMillon – (redshirt) sophomore (6'3, 245); 42 Keith Holcombe – (redshirt) junior (6'4, 227); 43 VanDarius Cowan – freshman (6'4, 226); 47 Christian Miller – (redshirt) junior (6'4, 230); 48 Mekhi Brown – (redshirt) sophomore (6'5, 243); 57 Ryan Burns – sophomore (6'0, 214); Defensive back: 2 Tony Brown – senior (6'0, 194); 3 Daniel Wright – freshman (6"1, 185); 5 Shyheim Carter – sophomore (6'0, 190); 6 Hootie Jones – senior (6'2, 214); 7 Trevon Diggs – sophomore (6'2, 185); 13 Nigel Knott – (redshirt) freshman (5'11, 190); 14 Deionte Thompson – (redshirt) sophomore (6'2, 190); 15 Ronnie Harrison – junior (6'3, 216); 21 Jared Mayden – sophomore (6'0, 198); 23 Rogria Lewis – senior (5'11, 196); 25 Xavier McKinney – freshman (6'1, 192); 26 Kyriq McDonald – freshman (5'11, 194); 28 Anthony Averett – (redshirt) senior (6'0, 180); 29 Minkah Fitzpatrick – junior (6'1, 200); 31 Keaton Anderson – (redshirt) sophomore (6'1, 215); 37 Donavan Mosley – junior (5'10, 185); 39 Levi Wallace – senior (6'0, 170); 43 Parker Bearden – sophomore (6'1, 201); 45 Bo Grant – senior (6'2, 201); Long snappers: 45 Thomas Fletcher – freshman (6'2, 220); 52 Scott Meyer – (redshirt) freshman (6'2, 226); 53 Ryan Parris – junior (6'0, 209)
: 2017 Alabama Crimson Tide Football Commits (08/05/2016)

=== Depth chart ===
As of the Crimson Tide's opening game against Florida State:

Defense

FS
Ronnie Harrison
Deionte Thompson
⋅

JACK	MIKE	WILL	SAM
Anfernee Jennings	Shaun Dion Hamilton	Rashaan Evans	Christian Miller
Christopher Allen	Mack Wilson	Keith Holcombe	Terrell Lewis
Jamey Mosley	⋅	Dylan Moses	⋅

SS
Minkah Fitzpatrick
Hootie Jones
⋅

CB
Anthony Averett
Levi Wallace
⋅

DE	NT	DE
Raekwon Davis	Daron Payne	Da'Shawn Hand
Quinnen Williams	Joshua Frazier	Isaiah Buggs
⋅	Johnny Dwight	⋅

CB
Tony Brown
Trevon Diggs
Shyheim Carter

Offense

WR
Calvin Ridley
Henry Ruggs
Derek Kief

WR
Cam Sims
Jerry Jeudy
Xavian Marks

LT	LG	C	RG	RT
Jonah Williams	Ross Pierschbacher	Bradley Bozeman	Lester Cotton	Matt Womack
Alex Leatherwood	Josh Casher	Brandon Kennedy	J. C. Hassenauer	Jedrick Wills
⋅	Dallas Warmack	⋅	Deonte Brown	Scott Lashley

TE
Hale Hentges
Irv Smith Jr.
Miller Forristall

WR
Robert Foster
DeVonta Smith
⋅

QB
Jalen Hurts
Tua Tagovailoa
⋅

Special teams
PK Andy Pappanastos
Joseph Bulovas
J. K. Scott
P J. K. Scott
KR Henry Ruggs
Trevon Diggs
Xavian Marks
PR Trevon Diggs
Henry Ruggs
Xavian Marks
LS Scott Meyer
Thomas Fletcher
H J. K. Scott

RB
Damien Harris
Bo Scarbrough
Josh Jacobs

== Statistics ==
=== Team ===
Team statistics
	Alabama	Opponents
Points	519	167
First Downs	311	215
Rushing Yards	3,509	1,326
Rushing Attempts	612	487
Average Per Rush	5.7	2.7
Rushing TDs	36	9
Passing Yards	2,708	2,320
Comp–Att	204-333	229–426
Comp %	61.3%	53.8%
Average Per Game	193.4	165.7
Average per Attempt	8.1	5.4
Passing TDs	28	8
INT's	3	19
Total Offense	6,217	3,646
Total Plays	945	913
Average Per Yards/Game	444.1	260.4
Kick Returns: # – Yards	20-438	52-973
Average	21.9	18.7
Punts	55	94
Yards	2,320	3,817
Average	42.2	40.6
Punt Returns: # – Yards	38-301	6-39
Average	7.9	6.5
Fumbles – Fumbles Lost	20-7	13–5
Penalties – Yards	69-569	61-455
3rd–Down Conversions	72/178	74/214
Percentage	40%	35%
4th–Down Conversions	15/18	7/19
Percentage	83%	37%
Field Goals - Attempts	19-28	14–16
Extra Point - Attempts	64-64	15–16
Sacks	40	27
Yards	274	154

=== Offense ===
Passing Statistics
NAME	POS	RAT	CMP	ATT	YDS	CMP%	TD	INT
Jalen Hurts	QB	150.2	154	255	2081	60.4	17	1
Tua Tagovailoa	QB	175.0	49	77	636	63.6	11	2
J. K. Scott	K	24.4	1	1	-9	100.0	0	0
Totals		155.5	204	333	2708	61.3	28	3

Rushing Statistics
NAME	POS	CAR	YDS	LONG	TD
Damien Harris	RB	135	1000	75	11
Jalen Hurts	QB	154	855	55	8
Bo Scarbrough	RB	124	596	44	8
Najee Harris	RB	61	370	35	3
Josh Jacobs	RB	46	284	45	1
Brian Robinson Jr.	RB	24	165	17	2
Tua Tagovailoa	QB	27	133	23	2
Ronnie Clark	RB	21	107	19	1
Calvin Ridley	WR	2	17	13	0
Robert Foster	WR	1	12	12	0
Austin Johnson	WR	2	8	6	0
TEAM		15	-38	0	0
TOTALS		612	3757	75	36

Receiving Statistics
NAME	POS	REC	YDS	LONG	TD
Calvin Ridley	WR	63	967	78	5
Bo Scarbrough	RB	17	109	15	0
Jerry Jeudy	WR	14	264	36	2
Cam Sims	WR	14	207	60	1
Robert Foster	WR	14	174	52	1
Josh Jacobs	RB	14	168	38	2
Irvin Smith Jr	TE	14	128	34	3
Henry Ruggs III	WR	12	229	60	6
Damien Harris	RB	12	91	17	0
Hale Hentges	TE	7	75	23	3
Najee Harris	RB	6	45	22	0
Derek Kief	WR	2	34	21	1
Major Tennison	TE	2	30	21	0
Xavian Marks	WR	1	24	24	0
Miller Forristall	TE	1	12	12	0
Daron Payne	DT	1	1	1	1
Jalen Hurts	QB	1	–1	–1	0
Andy Pappanastos	K	1	–9	–9	0
TOTALS		204	2708	78	28

=== Defense ===
Key: POS: Position, SOLO: Solo Tackles, AST: Assisted Tackles, TOT: Total Tackles, TFL: Tackles-for-loss, SACK: Quarterback Sacks, INT: Interceptions, BRK: Pass Breakups, FF: Forced Fumbles, FR: Fumbles Recovered, BLK: Kicks or Punts Blocked

Defensive Statistics
NAME	POS	SOLO	AST	TOT	TFL	SACKS	INT-YDS	BRK	FR	FF	BLK
Ronnie Harrison	S	43	31	74	4.5	2.5	3-7	4	0	0	0
Rashaan Evans	LB	35	39	74	13.0	6.0	0-0	3	1	1	0
Raekwon Davis	DE	24	45	69	10.0	8.5	1-19	0	1	0	0
Minkah Fitzpatrick	S	38	22	60	8.0	1.5	1-0	8	0	1	1
Daron Payne	DT	21	32	53	1.0	1.0	1-21	3	1	0	0
Hootie Jones	S	31	22	53	1.0	0	2-65	2	0	0	0
Isaiah Buggs	DE	20	31	51	4.0	1.5	0-0	0	0	0	0
Anthony Averett	CB	31	17	48	4.0	1.0	1-30	8	0	0	0
Levi Wallace	CB	31	17	48	4.5	2.0	3-66	15	0	0	0
Anfernee Jennings	LB	20	21	41	6.0	1.0	0-0	2	0	2	0
Shaun Dion Hamilton	LB	20	20	40	5.5	2.5	0-0	2	0	1	0
Mack Wilson	LB	21	19	40	2.5	0	4-39	2	0	0	0
Keith Holcombe	LB	15	23	38	2.0	1.0	0-0	3	1	0	0
Tony Brown	CB	18	13	31	1.0	0	1-0	2	0	0	0
Dylan Moses	LB	19	11	30	5.5	1.5	1-11	0	0	1	0
Da'Shawn Hand	DL	9	18	27	3.5	3.0	0-0	1	1	0	0
Deionte Thompson	S	18	7	25	1.0	0	1-21	1	0	0	0
Quinnen Williams	DL	11	9	20	6.5	2.0	0-0	0	0	0	0
Terrell Lewis	LB	10	6	16	2.0	1.0	0-0	1	0	0	0
Joshua Frazier	DL	8	7	15	2.5	0	0-0	3	0	1	0
Jamey Mosley	LB	3	10	13	1.5	1.0	0-0	1	0	0	0
Daniel Wright	S	4	6	10	0	0	0-0	0	0	0	0
Johnny Dwight	DL	6	3	9	3.5	1.0	0-0	0	0	0	0
Xavier McKinney	S	5	3	8	1.5	0	0-0	0	0	0	0
Mekhi Brown	LB	3	4	7	0	0	0-0	0	0	0	0
Shyheim Carter	CB	2	5	7	0	0	0-0	1	0	0	0
Christopher Allen	LB	4	2	6	1.0	0	0-0	0	0	1	0
Christian Miller	LB	4	2	6	2.0	1.0	0-0	0	0	0	0
Trevon Diggs	CB	3	3	6	0	0	0-0	3	0	0	0
LaBryan Ray	DL	2	3	5	2.5	1.0	0-0	0	0	0	0
Joshua McMillon	LB	3	2	5	0	0	0-0	1	0	0	0
Jamar King	DL	0	4	4	1.0	0	0-0	0	0	0	0
Jared Mayden	S	4	0	4	0	0	0-0	0	0	0	0
Keaton Anderson	S	2	1	3	0	0	0-0	0	0	0	0
Brian Robinson Jr.	RB	2	0	2	0	0	0-0	0	0	0	0
VanDarius Cowan	LB	1	1	2	0	0	0-0	0	0	0	0
Derek Kief	WR	1	1	2	0	0	0-0	0	0	0	0
Cam Sims	WR	1	0	1	0	0	0-0	0	0	0	0
DeVonta Smith	WR	1	0	1	0	0	0-0	0	0	0	0
Henry Ruggs III	WR	1	0	1	0	0	0-0	0	0	0	0
Robert Foster	WR	0	1	1	0	0	0-0	0	0	0	0
Josh Jacobs	RB	1	0	1	0	0	0-0	0	0	0	0
Damien Harris	RB	0	0	0	0	0	0-0	0	0	0	1
Totals		496	461	957	101	40	19-279	66	5	8	2

=== Special teams ===
Kicking statistics
NAME	POS	XPM	XPA	XP%	FGM	FGA	FG%	1–19	20–29	30–39	40–49	50+	LNG	PTS
Andy Pappanastos	K	56	56	100	18	25	72.0	0-0	7-7	6-8	5-10	0-0	46	110
J. K. Scott	P	8	8	100	1	3	33.3	0-0	0-0	0-0	1-1	0-2	48	11

Kick return statistics
NAME	RTNS	YDS	AVG	TD	LNG
Henry Ruggs III	13	239	18.4	0	23
Josh Jacobs	4	86	21.5	0	23
Trevon Diggs	2	74	37.0	0	55
Minkah Fitzpatrick	1	39	39.0	0	39
TOTALS	20	438	21.9	0	55

Punting statistics
NAME	POS	PUNTS	YDS	AVG	LONG	TB	FC	I–20	50+	BLK
J. K. Scott	P	54	2320	43.0	64	4	27	27	17	1

Punt return statistics
NAME	RTNS	YDS	AVG	TD	LONG
Trevon Diggs	18	154	8.6	0	21
Xavian Marks	11	82	7.5	0	26
Henry Ruggs III	8	46	5.8	0	16
Damien Harris	1	19	19.0	0	19
TOTALS	38	301	7.9	0	26

=== Scores by quarter (all opponents) ===
	1	2	3	4	OT	Total
All opponents	23	46	51	44	3	167
Alabama	145	125	152	91	6	519

== Awards and honors ==
=== Post-season finalists and winners ===
- Bronko-Nagurski Trophy: Defensive Player of the Year

Minkah Fitzpatrick (finalist)

- Broyles Award: Assistant Coach of the Year

Brian Daboll (finalist)

- Chuck Bednarik Award: Defensive Player of the Year

Minkah Fitzpatrick (finalist and winner)

- George Munger Award: Head Coach of the Year

Nick Saban (finalist and winner)

- Jim Thorpe Award: Nation's Best Defensive Back

Minkah Fitzpatrick (finalist and winner)

- Ray Guy Award: Nation's Best Punter

J. K. Scott (finalist)

- Rimington Trophy: Nation's Best Center

Bradley Bozeman (finalist)

- Walter Camp Award: Player of the Year

Minkah Fitzpatrick (finalist)

=== All-American Voting from Major Selectors ===
Associated Press (AP), American Football Coaches Association (AFCA), Football Writers Association of America (FWAA), The Sporting News (TSN), Walter Camp Football Foundation (WCFF)

All-American
Player	Position	AP	AFCA	FWAA	TSN	WCFF	Designation
Minkah Fitzpatrick	S	1	1	1	1	1	Unanimous
Rashaan Evans	LB		1				
Bradley Bozeman	C	2	2	2	2	2	
Jonah Williams	OT	3	2				
Daron Payne	DL		2				
J. K. Scott	P		2				
The NCAA recognizes a selection to all five of the AP, AFCA, FWAA, TSN and WCFF first teams for unanimous selections and three of five for consensus selections.

=== All-SEC Selections ===
The Crimson Tide had twelve players honored as members of the first or second team 2017 SEC All-Conference team as listed by either the AP poll or the Coaches Poll of the Southeastern Conference. The selections are listed below for each poll.

All-SEC
Player	Position	AP	Coaches
Calvin Ridley	WR	1	1
Jonah Williams	OT	1	1
Minkah Fitzpatrick	S	1	1
Daron Payne	DT	1	2
Bradley Bozeman	C	1	2
Ronnie Harrison	S	1	2
Rashaan Evans	LB	1	2
Raekwon Davis	LB	2	1
J. K. Scott	P	2	1
Ross Pierschbacher	OT	1	
Levi Wallace	CB	2	
Da'Shawn Hand	DT		2

=== Midseason Awards ===
- SEC Defensive Player of the Week

Shaun Dion Hamilton (v. Florida State, Week 1)
Levi Wallace (v. Ole Miss, Week 5), (v. Tennessee, Week 8)
Minkah Fitzpatrick (v. Texas A&M, Week 6)
Ronnie Harrison (v. LSU, Week 10)

- SEC Offensive Line Player of the Week

Matt Womack (v. Fresno State, Week 2)
Jonah Williams (v. Arkansas, Week 7)
J. C. Hassenauer (v. Mercer, Week 12)

- SEC Special Teams Player of the Week

J. K. Scott (v. LSU, Week 10)

=== Senior Bowl ===
The following players were invited to participate in the 2018 Senior Bowl:

Bradley Bozeman
Da'Shawn Hand
J. K. Scott
Levi Wallace

== 2018 NFL draft ==
The 2018 NFL draft was held on April 26–28 in Arlington, Texas. A school- and SEC-record 12 Alabama players were selected as part of the draft. Four additional players were signed to NFL teams as undrafted free agents.

Player	Position	Round	Overall pick	NFL team
Minkah Fitzpatrick	S	1	11	Miami Dolphins
Daron Payne	DT	1	13	Washington Redskins
Rashaan Evans	LB	1	22	Tennessee Titans
Calvin Ridley	WR	1	26	Atlanta Falcons
Ronnie Harrison	S	3	93	Jacksonville Jaguars
Da'Shawn Hand	DE	4	114	Detroit Lions
Anthony Averett	CB	4	118	Baltimore Ravens
J. K. Scott	P	5	172	Green Bay Packers
Shaun Dion Hamilton	LB	6	197	Washington Redskins
Bradley Bozeman	C	6	215	Baltimore Ravens
Bo Scarbrough	RB	7	236	Dallas Cowboys
Joshua Frazier	DT	7	246	Pittsburgh Steelers
Robert Foster	WR	Undrafted		Buffalo Bills
Levi Wallace	CB	Undrafted		Buffalo Bills
Tony Brown	CB	Undrafted		Los Angeles Chargers
J. C. Hassenauer	C	Undrafted		Atlanta Falcons
