= Cam Sims =

American football player (born 1996)

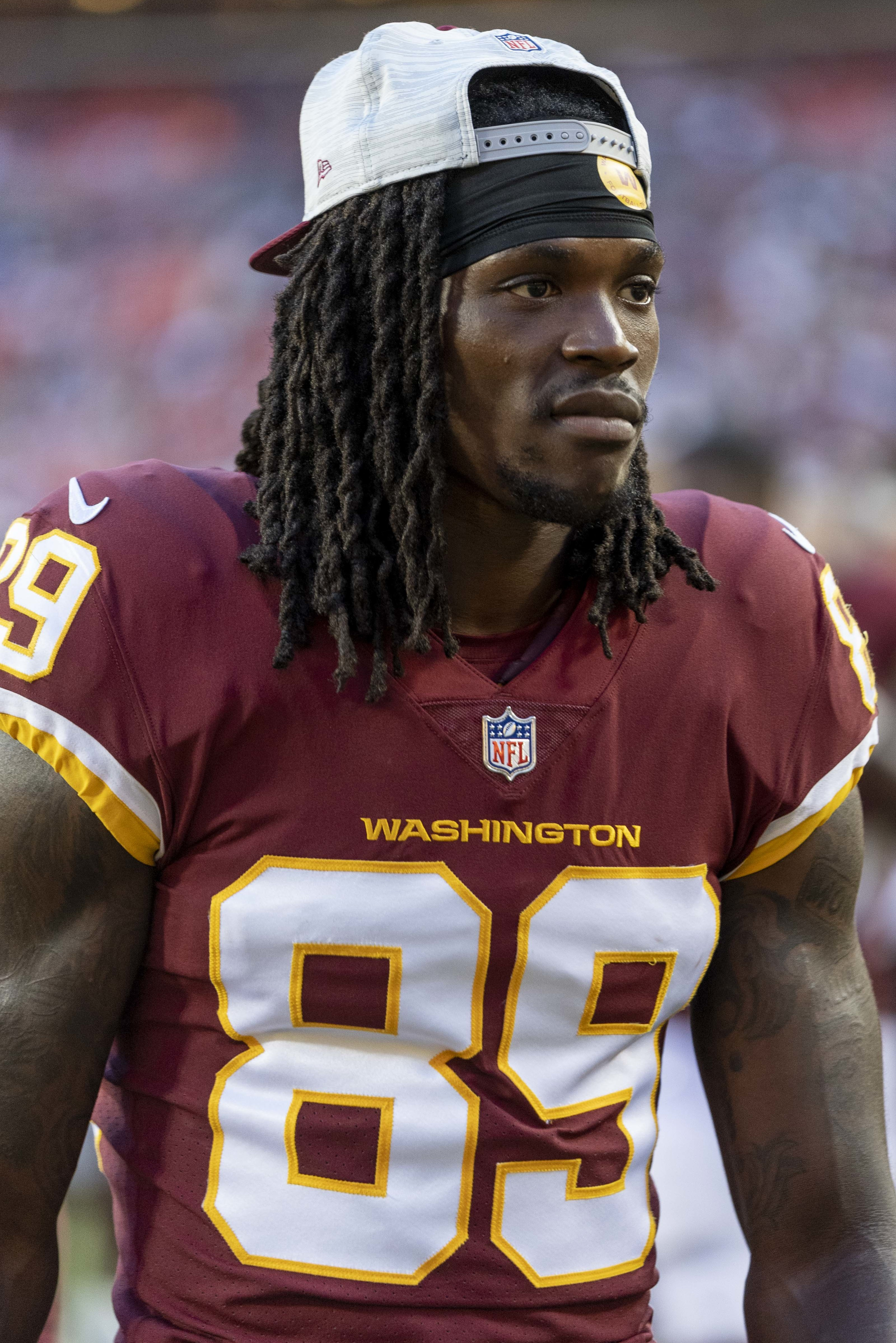
- Sims with the Washington Football Team in 2021

Profile
- Position: Wide receiver

Personal information
- Born: January 6, 1996 (age 30); Monroe, Louisiana, U.S.
- Listed height: 6 ft 5 in (1.96 m)
- Listed weight: 214 lb (97 kg)

Career information
- High school: Ouachita Parish (Ouachita Parish, Louisiana)
- College: Alabama (2014–2017)
- NFL draft: 2018: undrafted

Career history
- Washington Redskins / Football Team / Commanders (2018–2022); Las Vegas Raiders (2023)*; New York Giants (2023)*; Philadelphia Eagles (2023)*; Carolina Panthers (2023–2024)*
- * Offseason or practice squad member only

Awards and highlights
- 2× CFP national champion (2015, 2017)

Career NFL statistics as of 2024
- Receptions: 57
- Receiving yards: 804
- Receiving touchdowns: 3
- Stats at Pro Football Reference

Cameron Sims (born January 6, 1996) is an American professional football wide receiver. He played college football at Alabama and signed with the Washington Redskins as an undrafted free agent in 2018.

== Early life and college ==
Sims was born on January 6, 1998, in Monroe, Louisiana. He attended Ouachita Parish High School in Ouachita Parish, Louisiana, where he played on their football team as a tight end. Sims was considered a four-star recruit and committed to play college football at Alabama, where he played from 2014 to 2017. He was used sparingly his first two seasons before becoming a contributor during his junior and senior seasons.

=== Statistics ===
Year	Games	Receiving			
Year	Games	Rec	Yds	Avg	TD
2014	12	7	62	8.9	1
2015	13	6	46	7.7	0
2016	14	14	152	10.9	0
2017	14	14	207	14.8	1
Career	53	41	467	11.4	2

== Professional career ==
Pre-draft measurables
Height	Weight	Arm length	Hand span	40-yard dash	10-yard split	20-yard split	20-yard shuttle	Three-cone drill	Vertical jump	Broad jump
6 ft 3 5/8 in (1.92 m)	212 lb (96 kg)	33 1/4 in (0.84 m)	9 5/8 in (0.24 m)	4.59 s	1.62 s	2.68 s	4.49 s	7.57 s	34 in (0.86 m)	10 ft 3 in (3.12 m)

=== Washington Redskins / Football Team / Commanders ===
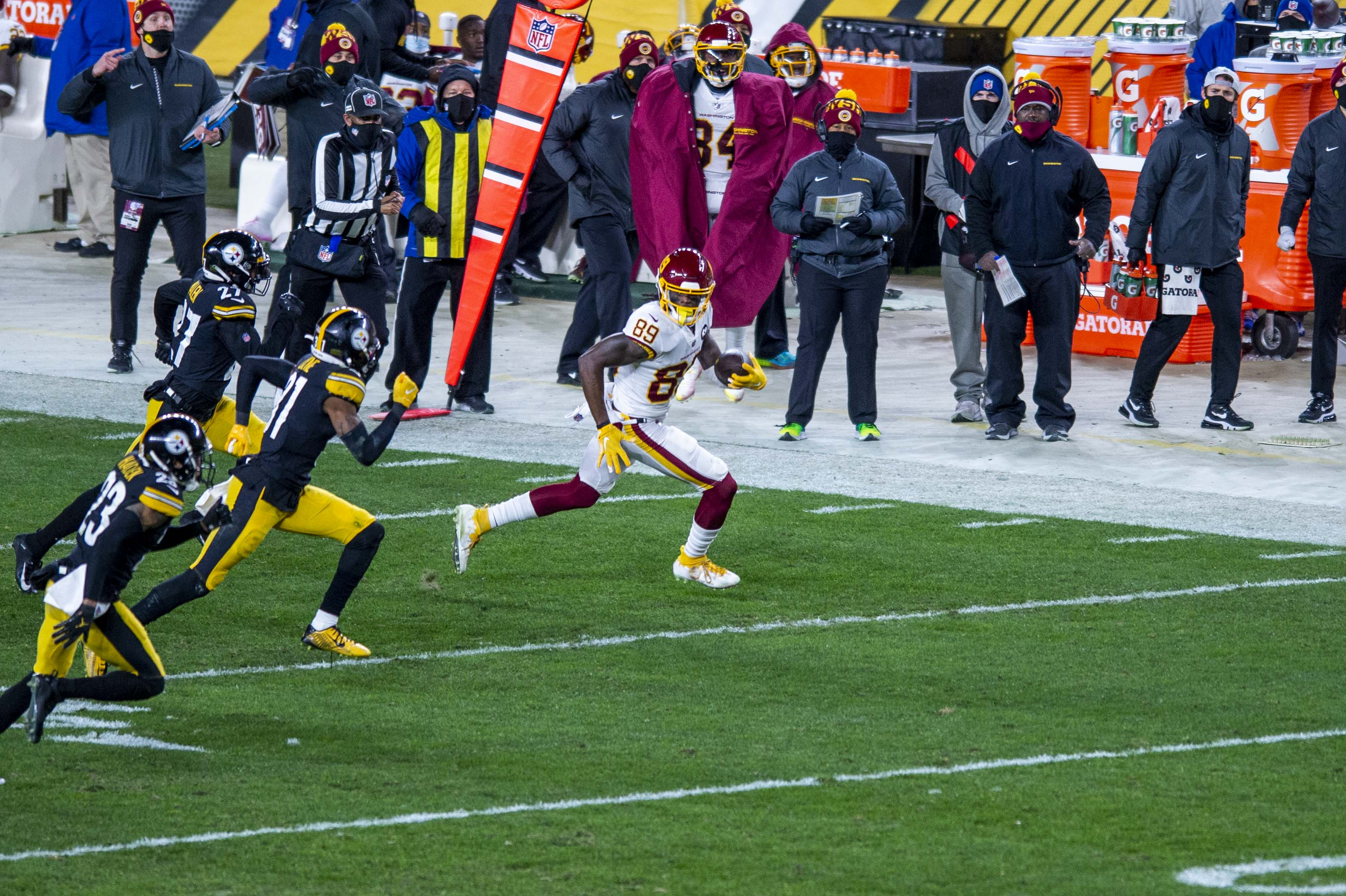
Sims playing against the Pittsburgh Steelers in 2020

After not being selected in the 2018 NFL draft, Sims signed with the Washington Redskins as an undrafted free agent on May 2, 2018. He suffered a season ending ankle injury in the first game of the 2018 season against the Arizona Cardinals, and was placed on injured reserve.

On August 31, 2019, Sims was waived by the Redskins and was signed to the team's practice squad the following day. He was promoted to the active roster on October 2, 2019. Sims was released by the team on October 19, 2019, but re-signed to the practice squad two days later. He was signed to the active roster on November 16, 2019.

He was waived by Washington on September 5, 2020, but signed with their practice squad the following day. He was elevated to the active roster for the team's first two games of the season against the Philadelphia Eagles and Cardinals, and was promoted to the active roster on September 22, 2020.

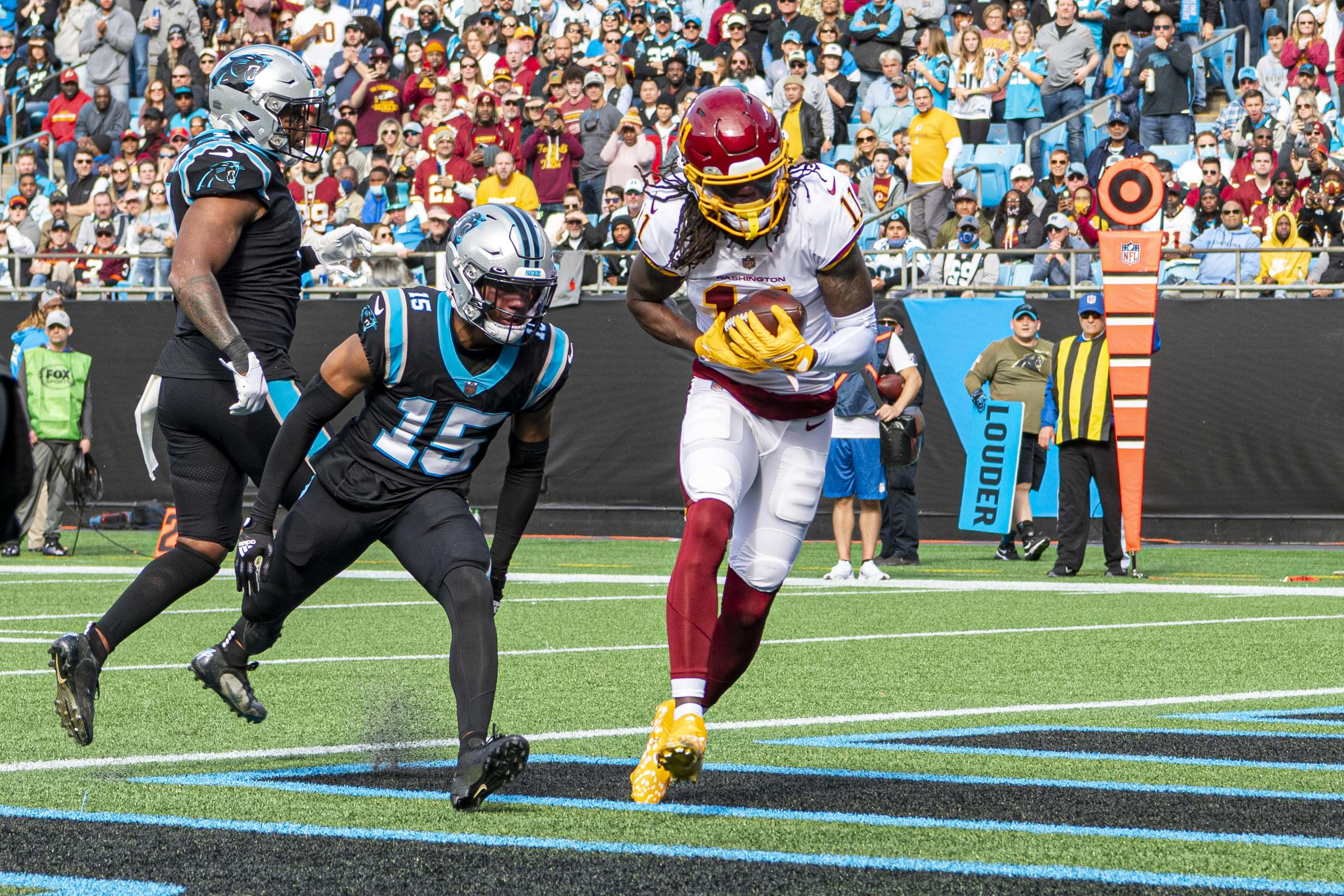
Sims scoring a touchdown against the Carolina Panthers in 2021

Sims recorded his first career touchdown in a Week 6 game against the New York Giants in 2020. Sims caught three passes for a career-high 110 yards in Week 9 against the Giants, the first 100-plus yard game of his career. Sims had five receptions for 92 yards in a Week 13 win against the Pittsburgh Steelers. Sims finished the 2020 regular season with 32 receptions for 477 yards and one receiving touchdown. Sims made his playoff debut in the Wild Card round against the Tampa Bay Buccaneers and was the team's leading receiver, catching seven passes for 104 yards.

Washington placed a restricted free agent tender on Sims on March 16, 2021, which he signed a week later. In Week 11 of the 2021 season, he recorded his second career receiving touchdown in a 27–21 win over the Carolina Panthers. In the Week 14 loss to the Dallas Cowboys, he had three receptions for 69 yards and a 43-yard touchdown from Taylor Heinicke. On December 15, 2021, Sims was placed on the COVID-19 reserve list, but was reactivated four days later. Sims re-signed a one-year deal with the team on March 17, 2022.

=== Las Vegas Raiders ===
Sims signed a one-year contract with the Las Vegas Raiders on March 21, 2023. He was released on August 29, 2023.

=== New York Giants ===
On September 4, 2023, Sims signed with the Giants' practice squad. He was released on October 10, 2023.

=== Philadelphia Eagles ===
On November 30, 2023, Sims was signed to the Philadelphia Eagles practice squad. On December 5, 2023, he was released.

=== Carolina Panthers ===
On December 6, 2023, Sims was signed to the Panthers practice squad. He signed a reserve/future contract on January 8, 2024. He was placed on the reserve/PUP list on July 26, 2024 and released on August 6.
