= Shaun Dion Hamilton =

American football player and coach (born 1995)

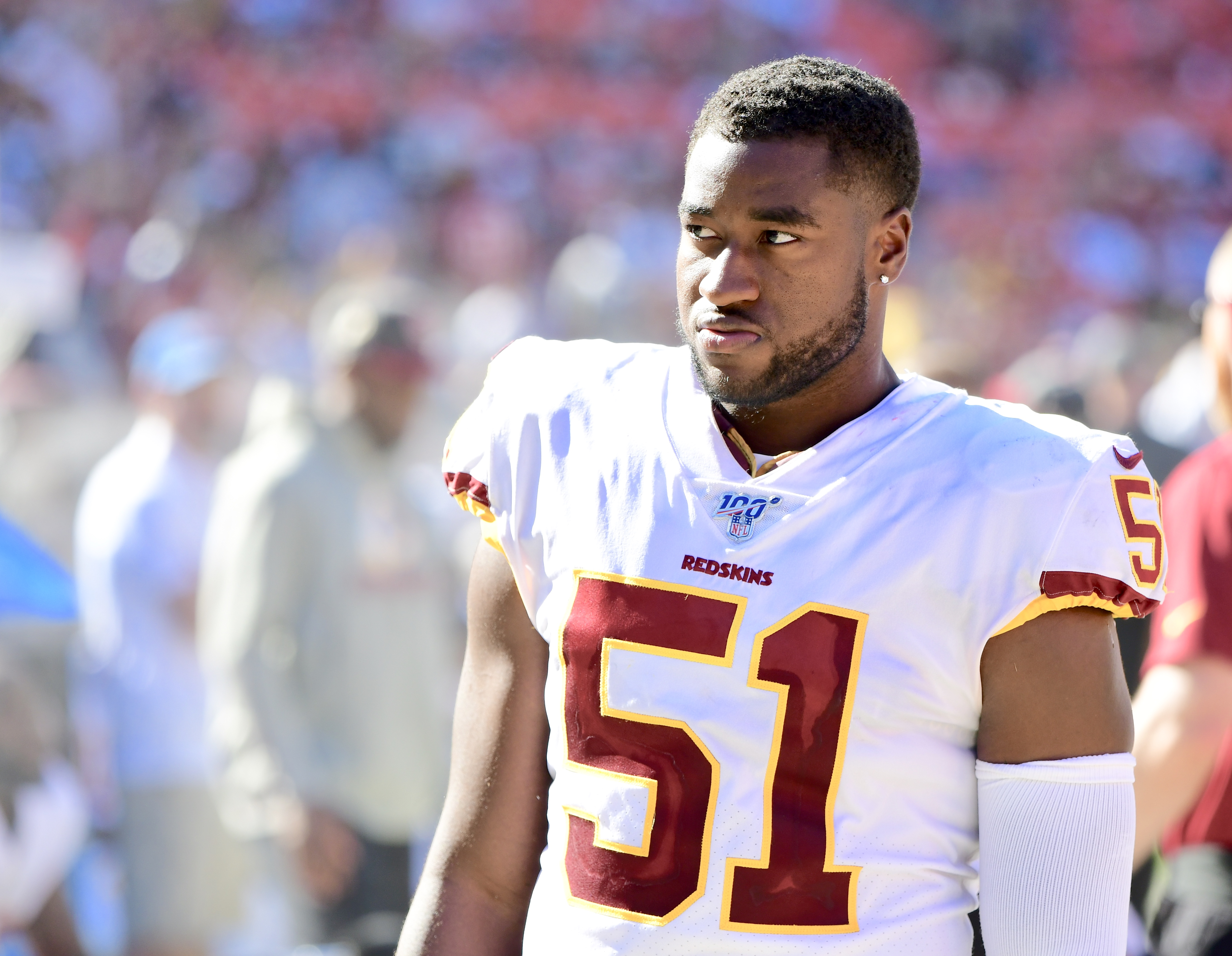
- Hamilton with the Washington Redskins in 2019

Detroit Lions
- Title: Linebackers coach

Personal information
- Born: September 11, 1995 (age 31); Montgomery, Alabama, U.S.
- Listed height: 6 ft 0 in (1.83 m)
- Listed weight: 235 lb (107 kg)

Career information
- Position: Linebacker (No. 51)
- High school: Carver (Montgomery)
- College: Alabama (2014–2017)
- NFL draft: 2018: 6th round, 197th overall pick

Career history

Playing
- Washington Redskins / Football Team (2018–2020); Detroit Lions (2021)

Coaching
- Detroit Lions (2022–present); Defensive assistant (2022); Assistant linebackers coach (2023–2024); Linebackers coach (2025–present)

Awards and highlights
- 2× CFP national champion (2015, 2017)

Career NFL statistics
- Total tackles: 97
- Sacks: 2.5
- Forced fumbles: 2
- Fumble recoveries: 1
- Interceptions: 1
- Pass deflections: 2
- Stats at Pro Football Reference

Shaun Dion Hamilton (born September 11, 1995) is an American professional football coach and former linebacker who is the linebackers coach for the Detroit Lions of the National Football League (NFL). He played college football for the Alabama Crimson Tide and was selected by the Washington Redskins in the sixth round of the 2018 NFL draft.

== Professional career ==
Pre-draft measurables
Height	Weight	Arm length	Hand span	Wingspan	Bench press
5 ft 11 3/4 in (1.82 m)	228 lb (103 kg)	31 in (0.79 m)	10 1/4 in (0.26 m)	6 ft 4 1/2 in (1.94 m)	20 reps
All values from NFL Combine

=== Washington Redskins / Football Team ===
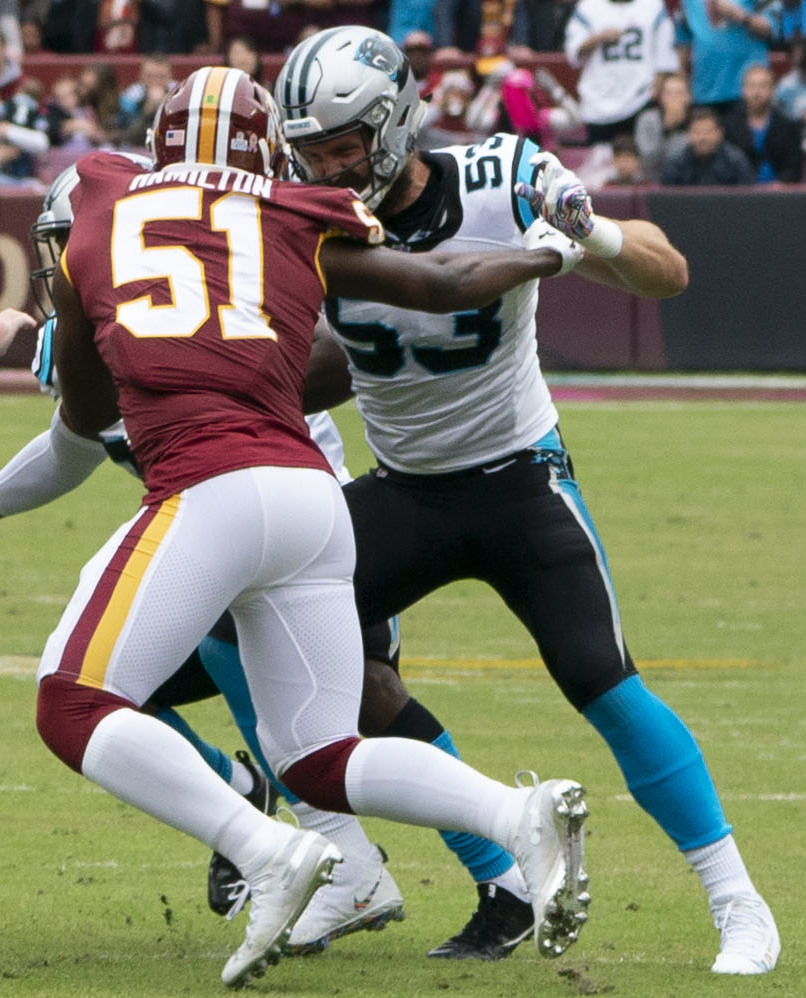
Hamilton in a game against the Carolina Panthers, 2018

Hamilton was selected by the Washington Redskins in the sixth round (197th overall pick) of the 2018 NFL draft. On May 10, 2018, he signed his rookie contract. Hamilton recorded his first career interception against the quarterback Josh Rosen in Week 6 win against the Miami Dolphins in the 2019 season. After Week 15 of the 2020 season, Hamilton was placed on injured reserve on December 21, 2020. Hamilton was waived on January 11, 2021.

=== Detroit Lions ===
On January 12, 2021, Hamilton was claimed off waivers by the Detroit Lions. He was placed on injured reserve on August 17.

On March 14, 2022, Hamilton re-signed with the Lions. He was released on August 23.

== Coaching career ==
After his release from Detroit, on September 7, 2022, Hamilton retired from playing to pursue a coaching career, joining the Lions coaching staff as a defensive assistant. On February 8, 2023, Hamilton accepted a role as an assistant linebackers coach with the same team. On January 25, 2025, after linebackers coach Kelvin Sheppard was promoted to be the defensive coordinator, the Lions promoted Hamilton to be the linebackers coach.
