= J. C. Hassenauer =

American football player (born 1995)

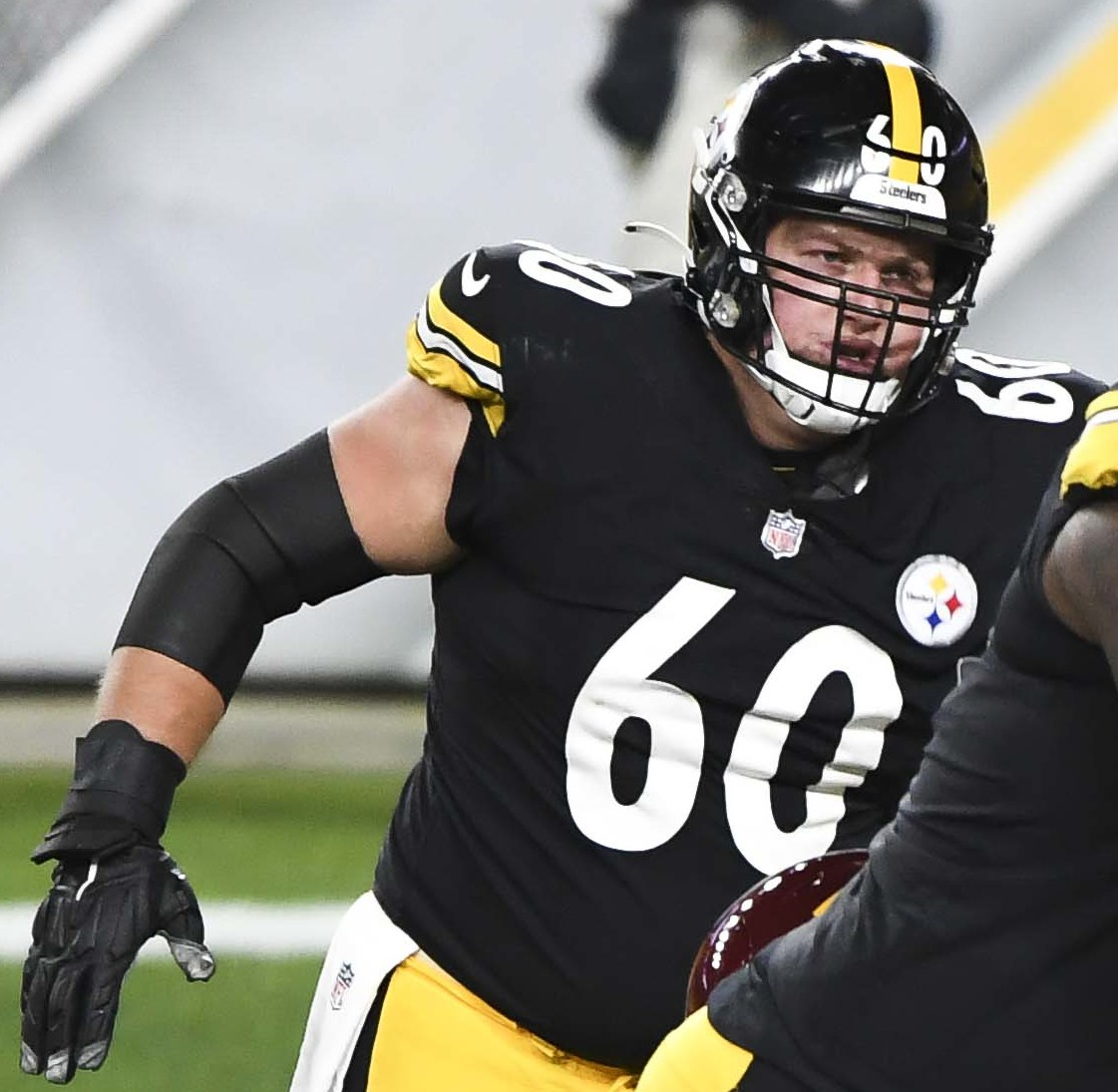
- Hassenauer with the Pittsburgh Steelers in 2020

Profile
- Position: Center

Personal information
- Born: September 15, 1995 (age 31); Woodbury, Minnesota, U.S.
- Listed height: 6 ft 2 in (1.88 m)
- Listed weight: 295 lb (134 kg)

Career information
- High school: East Ridge (Woodbury)
- College: Alabama (2014–2017)
- NFL draft: 2018: undrafted

Career history
- Atlanta Falcons (2018)*; Birmingham Iron (2019); Pittsburgh Steelers (2019–2022); New York Giants (2023); Washington Commanders (2024)*
- * Offseason or practice squad member only

Awards and highlights
- 2× CFP national champion (2015, 2017)

Career NFL statistics as of 2024
- Games played: 45
- Games started: 7
- Stats at Pro Football Reference

James "J. C." Hassenauer (born September 15, 1995) is an American professional football center. He played college football for the Alabama Crimson Tide, winning national championships in 2015 and 2017. Hassenauer has been a member of the Atlanta Falcons, Birmingham Iron, Pittsburgh Steelers, New York Giants, and Washington Commanders.

== Early life ==
Hassenauer played at East Ridge High under coach Mike Pendino. As a freshman, Hassenauer was only 5 ft 10 in (1.78 m) and weighed 180 pounds (82 kg). Following his coach's recommendation, Hasseneur trained with former Minnesota Gophers center Ray Hitchcock. By his senior year at East Ridge, Hassenauer's measurements expanded to 6 ft 3 in (1.91 m) and weighed 300 pounds (140 kg). During Hassenauer's time with the East Ridge Raptors, he played center and defensive tackle positions. He earned a letter in football as well as offers from Minnesota, Vanderbilt and Alabama. Hassenauer was rated a four-star recruiting prospect by 247Sports, Rivals.com and ESPN.com. He verbally accepted a scholarship offer to play center for Alabama in August 2013. It was reported in February 2014, Hassenauer signed with Alabama, making him the second player from Minnesota to sign with the university since 1925.

== College career ==
Hassenauer began his freshman season at Alabama in 2014 on the bench until called to play center against Texas A&M. Starting his sophomore season as a reserve offensive lineman, Hassenauer joined the Crimson Tide in Game 9 against Texas A&M replacing Ryan Kelly. He finished the season playing in only 7 games.

In 2016, during his junior season, Hassenauer was a backup center, playing in only 9 games with the Crimson Tide. During Hassenauer's senior season in 2017, he held reserve positions as guard and center and started in 3 of 8 games he played. He replaced Ross Pierschbacher during the second half of the game against Mississippi State. He replaced an injured Lester Cotton, during the second half of the game against Clemson. He earned Player of the Week honors for his performance against Mercer. Hassenauer started as a left guard during the game against Auburn before dropping out due to an injury.

Hassenauer earned a Master of Science in Marketing from Alabama in 2018.

== Professional career ==
Pre-draft measurables
Height	Weight	Arm length	Hand span	40-yard dash	10-yard split	20-yard split	20-yard shuttle	Three-cone drill	Vertical jump	Broad jump	Bench press
6 ft 2 1/2 in (1.89 m)	302 lb (137 kg)	32 5/8 in (0.83 m)	10 1/2 in (0.27 m)	5.23 s	1.83 s	3.07 s	4.64 s	7.88 s	27.5 in (0.70 m)	8 ft 5 in (2.57 m)	28 reps
All values from Pro Day

=== Atlanta Falcons ===
After playing four years at Alabama, Hassenauer was signed by the Atlanta Falcons as an undrafted free agent on April 30, 2018. He was waived on September 1 and signed to the practice squad the next day, where he spent most of the season.

=== Birmingham Iron ===
After the season ended, Hassenauer signed with the Birmingham Iron of the Alliance of American Football, where he played eight games.

=== Pittsburgh Steelers ===
On April 5, 2019, Hassenauer signed with the Pittsburgh Steelers, but was waived on August 31. On November 20, he was signed to the Steelers' practice squad, and was promoted to the active roster on December 24.

On December 2, 2020, Hassenauer made his first NFL start in a 19–14 win over the Baltimore Ravens.

Hassenauer signed a one-year contract extension with the Steelers on March 8, 2021. He was placed on injured reserve on November 27, 2021. He was activated on December 25.

=== New York Giants ===
On April 7, 2023, Hassenauer was signed by the New York Giants. On August 1, 2023, Hassenauer was placed on injured reserve with a torn tricep.

=== Washington Commanders ===
On August 6, 2024, Hassenauer signed with the Washington Commanders. He was released on August 23, 2024.
