= Tony Brown (defensive back, born 1995) =

American football player (born 1995)

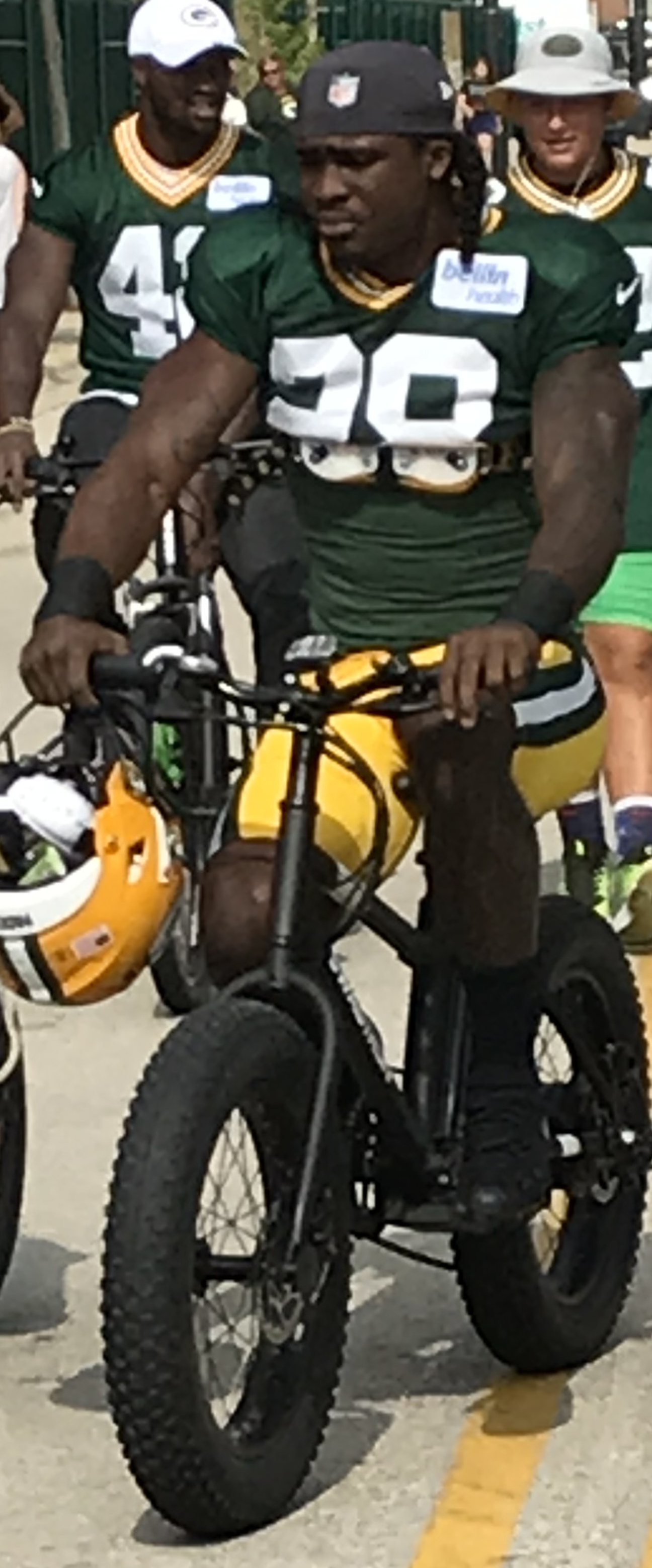
- Brown with the Green Bay Packers in 2019

Profile
- Position: Cornerback

Personal information
- Born: July 13, 1995 (age 31); Beaumont, Texas, U.S.
- Listed height: 6 ft 0 in (1.83 m)
- Listed weight: 200 lb (91 kg)

Career information
- High school: Ozen (Beaumont)
- College: Alabama (2014–2017)
- NFL draft: 2018: undrafted

Career history
- Los Angeles Chargers (2018)*; Green Bay Packers (2018–2019); Cincinnati Bengals (2020–2021); Las Vegas Raiders (2021)*; Indianapolis Colts (2022–2023); Cleveland Browns (2024)
- * Offseason or practice squad member only

Career NFL statistics as of 2024
- Total tackles: 80
- Sacks: 1
- Forced fumbles: 4
- Pass deflections: 7
- Interceptions: 1
- Stats at Pro Football Reference

Tony M. Brown Jr. (born July 13, 1995) is an American professional football cornerback. He played college football for the Alabama Crimson Tide, and signed as an undrafted free agent with the Los Angeles Chargers in 2018.

== Early life ==
Brown attended Clifton J. Ozen High School in Beaumont, Texas, where he played football and was a world-class athlete. As a freshman in 2010, he made 95 tackles, had one interception and 15 passes broken up. As a sophomore in 2011, he had 96 stops and three interceptions, while adding a fumble recovery and 16 pass breakups.

Also an accomplished track athlete, Brown won a silver medal in the 110-meter hurdles at the 2013 Pan American Junior Championships in Medellín, Colombia. He lost to Colombian Juan Carlos Moreno, who established a new South American Junior record at 13.42. Brown was named to the USA Today All-American Track and Field Team. At the 2013 Texas Class 4A Meet, he won the state title in the 110-meter hurdles (13.63 s), and took third in the 100 meters (10.37 s). He ran a personal-best of 7.76 seconds in the indoor 60m hurdles, the fastest time in the nation in 2013. He ran a PR of 13.38 seconds in the 110m hurdles at the 2013 Texas Relays, the top time in the U.S. in 2013. He won the 110m hurdles at the 2013 USATF National Junior Olympics (13.88 s) and the USATF Junior Nationals (13.69 s). He also recorded a personal-best time of 37.32 seconds in the 300m hurdles at the 2012 Texas Class 4A Meet, where he placed first.

Considered a five-star football recruit by ESPN.com, Brown was listed as the No. 2 cornerback in the nation in 2014. He committed to Alabama at the 2014 Under Armour All-America Game.

== College career ==
Brown graduated early from high school and enrolled at the University of Alabama in January 2014, where he began participating in football and track and field. He improved his 100 meters time to 10.12 seconds in the NCAA semi-finals. On January 18, 2014, he was arrested in Tuscaloosa, Alabama. On December 31, 2015, he was suspended and sent home for starting a fight while preparing for the 2015 Cotton Bowl.

== Professional career ==
Pre-draft measurables
Height	Weight	Arm length	Hand span	40-yard dash	10-yard split	20-yard split	20-yard shuttle	Three-cone drill	Vertical jump	Broad jump	Bench press
5 ft 11 7/8 in (1.83 m)	199 lb (90 kg)	31 1/2 in (0.80 m)	9 1/4 in (0.23 m)	4.35 s	1.47 s	2.56 s	4.11 s	6.78 s	31.5 in (0.80 m)	10 ft 6 in (3.20 m)	14 reps

=== Los Angeles Chargers ===
Despite running a 4.35 second 40 yard dash, the third fastest at the combine, Brown went undrafted in the 2018 NFL draft. He signed with the Los Angeles Chargers as an undrafted free agent following the 2018 NFL draft on April 28, 2018. He was waived on September 1, 2018.

=== Green Bay Packers ===
On September 3, 2018, Brown was signed to the practice squad of the Green Bay Packers. He was promoted to the active roster on September 29, 2018. Brown was released on December 28, 2019.

=== Cincinnati Bengals ===
On December 30, 2019, Brown was claimed off waivers by the Cincinnati Bengals, his rights will be awarded to the Bengals after Super Bowl LIV. He signed a one-year contract extension with the team on March 12, 2020. He was named a backup cornerback to start the 2020 season. He made his first career start in Week 10, recording six tackles, two for a loss, and a pass deflection. He was placed on injured reserve on December 5, 2020. On December 26, 2020, Brown was activated off of injured reserve.

Brown re-signed with the Bengals on another one-year contract on March 18, 2021. He was waived on August 31, 2021, and re-signed to the practice squad the next day. He was released on October 5.

=== Las Vegas Raiders ===
On October 13, 2021, Brown was signed to the Las Vegas Raiders practice squad. He was released on November 1, but later re-signed on December 23.

=== Indianapolis Colts ===
On March 8, 2022, Brown signed with the Indianapolis Colts. He was waived on August 31, 2022, and re-signed to the practice squad. He was promoted to the active roster on September 13.

Brown re-signed with the Colts on a one-year contract on March 16, 2023. The Colts suspended him for three games for conduct detrimental to the team on December 19. On January 8, 2024, the Colts waived him.

=== Cleveland Browns ===
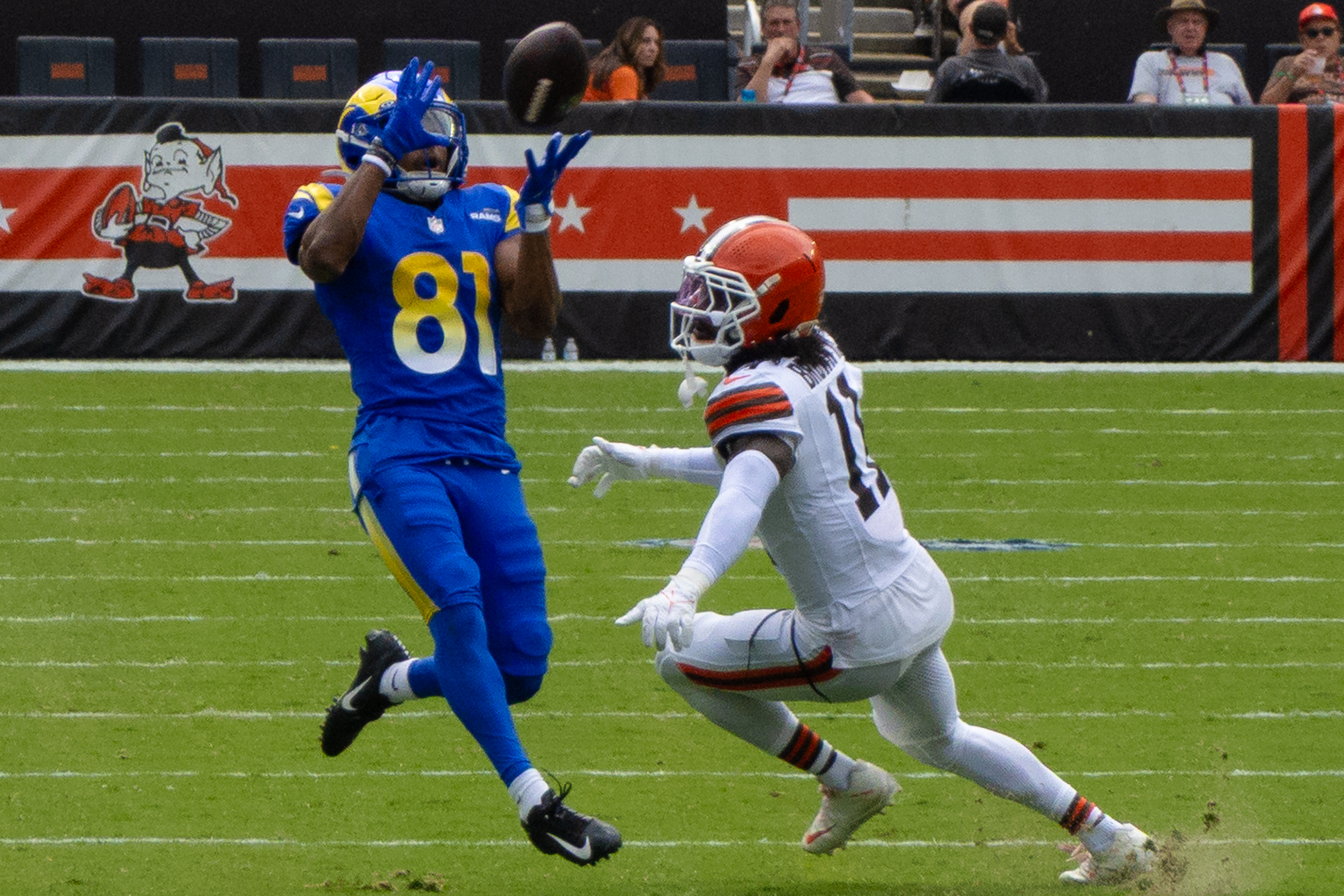
Brown (right) playing against the Los Angeles Rams in the 2025 preseason

On March 19, 2024, Brown signed with the Cleveland Browns. He was released on August 27, and re-signed to the practice squad. On October 10, Brown was signed to the active roster. In 6 games for Cleveland, he recorded one forced fumble and five combined tackles.

On March 20, 2025, Brown re-signed with Cleveland. He was released on August 24.

== NFL career statistics ==
Regular season statistics
Year	Team	Games		Tackles				Interceptions						Fumbles	
Year	Team	GP	GS	Cmb	Solo	Ast	Sck	PD	Int	Yds	Avg	Lng	TD	FF	FR
2018	GB	11	3	34	30	4	0.0	5	0	0	0.0	0	0	2	0
2019	GB	9	0	11	7	4	0.0	0	0	0	0.0	0	0	0	0
2020	CIN	13	1	13	7	6	0.0	1	0	0	0.0	0	0	0	0
2022	IND	16	0	7	2	5	1.0	0	0	0	0.0	0	0	0	0
2023	IND	12	1	10	8	2	0.0	1	1	34	34.0	34	0	1	0
2024	CLE	6	0	5	2	3	0.0	0	0	0	0.0	0	0	1	0
Career		67	5	80	56	24	1.0	7	1	34	34.0	34	0	4	0
Source: NFL.com
