= 2019 Alabama Crimson Tide football team =

American college football season

2019 Alabama Crimson Tide football

Citrus Bowl champion

Citrus Bowl, W 35–16 vs. Michigan
- Conference: Southeastern Conference
- Western Division

Ranking
- Coaches: No. 8
- AP: No. 8
- Record: 11–2 (6–2 SEC)
- Head coach: Nick Saban (13th season)
- Offensive coordinator: Steve Sarkisian (1st season)
- Offensive scheme: Pro spread
- Defensive coordinator: Pete Golding (2nd season)
- Co-defensive coordinator: Charles Kelly (1st season)
- Base defense: 3–4
- Captains: Anfernee Jennings; DeVonta Smith; Tua Tagovailoa; Xavier McKinney
- Home stadium: Bryant–Denny Stadium

Uniform
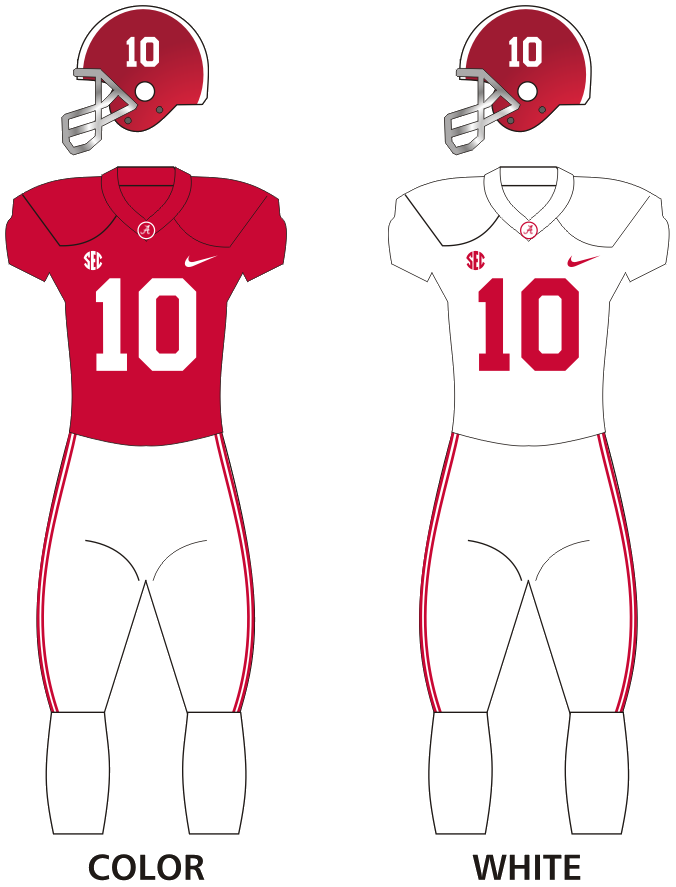

2019 Southeastern Conference football standings
| | Conf. | | | Overall |
| Team | W | | L | W | | L |
|---|---|---|---|---|---|---|
Eastern Division
| No. 4 Georgia x | 7 | – | 1 | 12 | – | 2 |
| No. 6 Florida | 6 | – | 2 | 11 | – | 2 |
| Tennessee * | 5 | – | 3 | 8 | – | 5 |
| Kentucky | 3 | – | 5 | 8 | – | 5 |
| Missouri * | 3 | – | 5 | 6 | – | 6 |
| South Carolina | 3 | – | 5 | 4 | – | 8 |
| Vanderbilt | 1 | – | 7 | 3 | – | 9 |
Western Division
| No. 1 LSU x$#^ | 8 | – | 0 | 15 | – | 0 |
| No. 8 Alabama | 6 | – | 2 | 11 | – | 2 |
| No. 14 Auburn | 5 | – | 3 | 9 | – | 4 |
| Texas A&M | 4 | – | 4 | 8 | – | 5 |
| Mississippi State | 3 | – | 5 | 6 | – | 7 |
| Ole Miss | 2 | – | 6 | 4 | – | 8 |
| Arkansas | 0 | – | 8 | 2 | – | 10 |
Championship: LSU 37, Georgia 10
# – College Football Playoff champion; ^ – College Football Playoff participant; $ – Conference champion; x – Division champion/co-champions; * – Tennessee vacated all wins due to NCAA violations. Missouri was ineligible for postseason due to NCAA sanctions.; Rankings from AP Poll

The 2019 Alabama Crimson Tide football team represented the University of Alabama in the 2019 NCAA Division I FBS football season. This was the Crimson Tide's 125th overall season, 86th as a member of the Southeastern Conference (SEC), and 28th within the SEC's Western Division. They played their home games at Bryant–Denny Stadium in Tuscaloosa, Alabama, and were led by 13th-year head coach Nick Saban.

The defending national runners-up, Alabama began the season ranked second in the AP Poll, and were the favorites to repeat as SEC Champions. The Crimson Tide won their first seven games of the year handily, and rose to first in the AP Poll. They were ranked third in the season's first College Football Playoff rankings heading into an anticipated match-up against second-ranked LSU, which Alabama lost 46–41. The next week, Alabama lost starting quarterback Tua Tagovailoa to a season-ending hip injury in the game against Mississippi State. They finished the regular season with a 48–45 upset loss to cross-state rival Auburn.

With a regular season record of 10–2, Alabama was not selected for the College Football Playoff for the first time ever, having made the CFP every year since the inception of the format in 2014. The Crimson Tide were also not invited to a New Year's Six bowl game, making this the first season since 2010 that Alabama was not selected to a NY6 or BCS bowl. They were instead invited to the Citrus Bowl, where they defeated Michigan.

Tagovailoa, at the time of his injury, was considered a candidate for the Heisman Trophy and was on pace to break his own NCAA FBS passer rating record. He was replaced by backup Mac Jones for the remainder of the season. Running back Najee Harris led the team with 1,224 rushing yards and 20 total touchdowns, tied for the SEC lead. Receivers Jerry Jeudy and DeVonta Smith were both named All-SEC. On defense, the team was led by first-team all-conference players linebacker Anfernee Jennings and safety Xavier McKinney. Nine Alabama players were selected in the 2020 NFL draft, including No. 5 overall selection Tua Tagovailoa.

== Offseason ==
=== Offseason departures ===
Seven Alabama players with remaining eligibility declared early for the 2019 NFL draft. In addition, 14 seniors from the 2018 team graduated.

2019 Alabama offseason departures
| Name | Number | Pos. | Height | Weight | Year | Hometown | Notes |
|---|---|---|---|---|---|---|---|
| Josh Jacobs | #8 | RB | 5'10 | 216 | Junior | Tulsa, OK | Declared for 2019 NFL draft |
| Irv Smith Jr. | #82 | TE | 6'4 | 241 | Junior | New Orleans, LA | Declared for 2019 NFL draft |
| Jonah Williams | #73 | OL | 6'5 | 301 | Junior | Folsom, CA | Declared for 2019 NFL draft |
| Quinnen Williams | #92 | DL | 6'4 | 295 | RS Sophomore | Birmingham, AL | Declared for 2019 NFL draft |
| Saivion Smith | #4 | CB | 6'1 | 201 | Junior | Tampa, FL | Declared for 2019 NFL draft |
| Deionte Thompson | #14 | S | 6'2 | 196 | RS Junior | Orange, TX | Declared for 2019 NFL draft |
| Mack Wilson | #30 | LB | 6'2 | 238 | Junior | Montgomery, AL | Declared for 2019 NFL draft |
| Isaiah Buggs | #49 | DL | 6'5 | 286 | Senior | Ruston, LA | Graduated |
| Joshua Casher | #67 | OL | 6'1 | 290 | Senior | Mobile, AL | Graduated |
| Ronnie Clark | #5 | RB | 6'2 | 230 | Senior | Calera, AL | Graduated |
| Lester Cotton Sr. | #66 | OL | 6'4 | 325 | Senior | Tuscaloosa, AL | Graduated |
| Johnny Dwight | #95 | DL | 6'3 | 301 | Senior | Rochelle, GA | Graduated |
| Damien Harris | #34 | RB | 5'11 | 215 | Senior | Richmond, KY | Graduated |
| Hale Hentges | #84 | TE | 6'5 | 254 | Senior | Jefferson City, MO | Graduated |
| Austin Jones | #29 | PK | 5'10 | 215 | Senior | Orlando, FL | Graduated |
| Derek Kief | #81 | WR | 6'4 | 204 | Senior | Cincinnati, OH | Graduated |
| Xavian Marks | #19 | WR | 5'8 | 174 | Senior | Rosenberg, TX | Graduated |
| Christian Miller | #47 | LB | 6'4 | 244 | Senior | Columbia, SC | Graduated |
| Jamey Mosley | #16 | LB | 6'5 | 239 | Senior | Mobile, AL | Graduated |
| Ross Pierschbacher | #71 | OL | 6'4 | 309 | Senior | Cedar Falls, IA | Graduated |

=== Recruiting ===
Alabama's 2019 recruiting class consisted of 27 recruits, 15 of which enrolled early. Alabama had the highest ranked class in the nation according to 247Sports.com and ESPN, and had the second best class behind Georgia according to Rivals.com. The class was ranked No. 1 by the 247Sports Composite, which aggregates the ratings of the major recruiting services. Headlining the class were consensus top-10 recruits Antonio Alfano (defensive end), Trey Sanders (running back), and Evan Neal (offensive tackle).

College recruiting (2019)
| Name | Hometown | School | Height | Weight | Commit date |
|---|---|---|---|---|---|
| Antonio Alfano; DT | Colonia, New Jersey | Colonia High School | 6 ft 4 in (1.93 m) | 275 lb (125 kg) | May 18, 2018 |
| Antonio Alfano; DT | Recruit ratings: Rivals: 247Sports: ESPN: (86) | | | | |
| Marcus Banks; CB | Houston, Texas | Andy Dekaney High School | 6 ft 0 in (1.83 m) | 166 lb (75 kg) | Jan 5, 2019 |
| Marcus Banks; CB | Recruit ratings: Rivals: 247Sports: ESPN: (81) | | | | |
| Jordan Battle; S | Fort Lauderdale, Florida | Saint Thomas Aquinas High School | 6 ft 1 in (1.85 m) | 187 lb (85 kg) | Dec 19, 2018 |
| Jordan Battle; S | Recruit ratings: Rivals: 247Sports: ESPN: (84) | | | | |
| Jahleel Billingsley; TE | Chicago, Illinois | Wendell Phillips Academy | 6 ft 4 in (1.93 m) | 216 lb (98 kg) | Jul 7, 2018 |
| Jahleel Billingsley; TE | Recruit ratings: Rivals: 247Sports: ESPN: (80) | | | | |
| Tanner Bowles; OT | Glasgow, Kentucky | Glasgow High School | 6 ft 5 in (1.96 m) | 273 lb (124 kg) | Apr 22, 2018 |
| Tanner Bowles; OT | Recruit ratings: Rivals: 247Sports: ESPN: (82) | | | | |
| Jeffery Carter; CB | Mansfield, Texas | Mansfield Legacy High School | 6 ft 0 in (1.83 m) | 182 lb (83 kg) | Apr 16, 2018 |
| Jeffery Carter; CB | Recruit ratings: Rivals: 247Sports: ESPN: (86) | | | | |
| Darrian Dalcourt; OG | Baltimore, Maryland | St. Frances Academy | 6 ft 3 in (1.91 m) | 299 lb (136 kg) | Aug 9, 2018 |
| Darrian Dalcourt; OG | Recruit ratings: Rivals: 247Sports: ESPN: (84) | | | | |
| D. J. Dale; DT | Pinson, Alabama | Clay-Chalkville High School | 6 ft 4 in (1.93 m) | 323 lb (147 kg) | May 2, 2018 |
| D. J. Dale; DT | Recruit ratings: Rivals: 247Sports: ESPN: (83) | | | | |
| Justin Eboigbe; DE | Forest Park, Georgia | Forest Park High School | 6 ft 5 in (1.96 m) | 263 lb (119 kg) | Jun 16, 2018 |
| Justin Eboigbe; DE | Recruit ratings: Rivals: 247Sports: ESPN: (86) | | | | |
| Christian Harris; ATH | Baton Rouge, Louisiana | LSU Laboratory School | 6 ft 1 in (1.85 m) | 225 lb (102 kg) | Nov 28, 2018 |
| Christian Harris; ATH | Recruit ratings: Rivals: 247Sports: ESPN: (84) | | | | |
| Kevin Harris; DE | Loganville, Georgia | Grayson High School | 6 ft 4 in (1.93 m) | 217 lb (98 kg) | May 1, 2018 |
| Kevin Harris; DE | Recruit ratings: Rivals: 247Sports: ESPN: (84) | | | | |
| DeMarcco Hellams; ATH | Hyattsville, Maryland | DeMatha Catholic High School | 6 ft 1 in (1.85 m) | 203 lb (92 kg) | Jun 11, 2018 |
| DeMarcco Hellams; ATH | Recruit ratings: Rivals: 247Sports: ESPN: (84) | | | | |
| Braylen Ingraham; DE | Fort Lauderdale, Florida | Saint Thomas Aquinas High School | 6 ft 4 in (1.93 m) | 270 lb (120 kg) | Oct 23, 2018 |
| Braylen Ingraham; DE | Recruit ratings: Rivals: 247Sports: ESPN: (84) | | | | |
| Amari Kight; OT | Alabaster, Alabama | Thompson High School | 6 ft 7 in (2.01 m) | 307 lb (139 kg) | Apr 29, 2018 |
| Amari Kight; OT | Recruit ratings: Rivals: 247Sports: ESPN: (86) | | | | |
| Shane Lee; LB | Baltimore, Maryland | St Frances Academy | 6 ft 0 in (1.83 m) | 243 lb (110 kg) | Apr 17, 2018 |
| Shane Lee; LB | Recruit ratings: Rivals: 247Sports: ESPN: (84) | | | | |
| John Metchie III; WR | Hightstown, New Jersey | The Peddie School | 6 ft 0 in (1.83 m) | 195 lb (88 kg) | Jul 7, 2018 |
| John Metchie III; WR | Recruit ratings: Rivals: 247Sports: ESPN: (80) | | | | |
| King Mwikuta; DE | LaGrange, Georgia | Troup County High School | 6 ft 5 in (1.96 m) | 222 lb (101 kg) | Dec 15, 2017 |
| King Mwikuta; DE | Recruit ratings: Rivals: 247Sports: ESPN: (83) | | | | |
| Evan Neal; OT | Bradenton, Florida | IMG Academy | 6 ft 7 in (2.01 m) | 360 lb (160 kg) | Dec 19, 2018 |
| Evan Neal; OT | Recruit ratings: Rivals: 247Sports: ESPN: (91) | | | | |
| Pierce Quick; OT | Trussville, Alabama | Hewitt-Trussville High School | 6 ft 5 in (1.96 m) | 287 lb (130 kg) | Apr 22, 2017 |
| Pierce Quick; OT | Recruit ratings: Rivals: 247Sports: ESPN: (91) | | | | |
| Will Reichard; K | Hoover, Alabama | Hoover High School | 6 ft 1 in (1.85 m) | 185 lb (84 kg) | May 23, 2018 |
| Will Reichard; K | Recruit ratings: Rivals: 247Sports: ESPN: (79) | | | | |
| Keilan Robinson; RB | Washington, D.C. | St. John's College High School | 5 ft 10 in (1.78 m) | 186 lb (84 kg) | Jun 27, 2018 |
| Keilan Robinson; RB | Recruit ratings: Rivals: 247Sports: ESPN: (82) | | | | |
| Trey Sanders; RB | Bradenton, Florida | IMG Academy | 6 ft 0 in (1.83 m) | 216 lb (98 kg) | Dec 19, 2018 |
| Trey Sanders; RB | Recruit ratings: Rivals: 247Sports: ESPN: (88) | | | | |
| Ishmael Sopsher; DT | Amite, LA | Amite HS | 6 ft 4 in (1.93 m) | 330 lb (150 kg) | Feb 6, 2019 |
| Ishmael Sopsher; DT | Recruit ratings: Rivals: 247Sports: ESPN: (86) | | | | |
| Taulia Tagovailoa; QB | Alabaster, Alabama | Thompson High School | 6 ft 0 in (1.83 m) | 204 lb (93 kg) | Apr 22, 2018 |
| Taulia Tagovailoa; QB | Recruit ratings: Rivals: 247Sports: ESPN: (83) | | | | |
| Brandon Turnage; CB | Oxford, Mississippi | Lafayette High School | 6 ft 0 in (1.83 m) | 180 lb (82 kg) | Dec 22, 2017 |
| Brandon Turnage; CB | Recruit ratings: Rivals: 247Sports: ESPN: (84) | | | | |
| Paul Tyson; QB | Trussville, Alabama | Hewitt-Trussville High School | 6 ft 4 in (1.93 m) | 217 lb (98 kg) | Apr 5, 2018 |
| Paul Tyson; QB | Recruit ratings: Rivals: 247Sports: ESPN: (80) | | | | |
| Byron Young; DE | Laurel, Mississippi | West Jones High School | 6 ft 4 in (1.93 m) | 255 lb (116 kg) | Jul 3, 2018 |
| Byron Young; DE | Recruit ratings: Rivals: 247Sports: ESPN: (84) | | | | |
Overall recruit ranking: Rivals: 2 247Sports: 1 ESPN: 1
Note: In many cases, Scout, Rivals, 247Sports, On3, and ESPN may conflict in their listings of height and weight.; In these cases, the average was taken. ESPN grades are on a 100-point scale.; Sources: "Rivals commits". Rivals.; "ESPN commits". ESPN.; "2019 Team Ranking". Rivals.com.; "247Sports commits". 247Sports.

=== Transfers ===
Outgoing

| Name | No. | Pos. | Height | Weight | Year | Hometown | New school |
|---|---|---|---|---|---|---|---|
| Jalen Hurts | #2 | QB | 6'2 | 225 | Junior | Channelview, Texas | Oklahoma |
| Richie Petitbon | #72 | OT | 6'5 | 310 | Junior | Washington, DC | Illinois |
| Layne Hatcher | #18 | QB | 6'0 | 212 | RS Freshman | Little Rock, Arkansas | Arkansas State |
| Kyriq McDonald | #16 | DB | 5'11 | 197 | RS Freshman | Madison, Alabama | Cincinnati |
| Kedrick James | #45 | TE | 6'5 | 260 | RS Junior | Waco, Texas | SMU |
| Scott Meyer | #18 | QB | 6'2 | 232 | RS Junior | Alpharetta, Georgia | Vanderbilt |
| Eyabi Anoma | #9 | LB | 6'5 | 252 | Sophomore | Baltimore, Maryland | Houston |

Incoming

| Name | No. | Pos. | Height | Weight | Year | Hometown | Prev. school |
|---|---|---|---|---|---|---|---|
| Landon Dickerson | #69 | OL | 6'6 | 308 | 2019 | Hickory, N.C. | Florida State |

=== Returning starters ===
Offense

| Player | Class | Position |
|---|---|---|
| Tua Tagovailoa | Junior | Quarterback |
| Jerry Jeudy | Junior | Wide receiver |
| Henry Ruggs | Junior | Wide receiver |
| DeVonta Smith | Junior | Wide receiver |
| Jaylen Waddle | Sophomore | Wide receiver |
| Najee Harris | Junior | Running back |
| Alex Leatherwood | Junior | Offensive line |
| Jedrick Wills | Junior | Offensive line |

Defense

| Player | Class | Position |
|---|---|---|
| Raekwon Davis | Senior | Defensive end |
| Anfernee Jennings | RS Senior | Linebacker |
| Terrell Lewis | RS Junior | Linebacker |
| Dylan Moses | Junior | Linebacker |
| Trevon Diggs | Senior | Defensive back |
| Patrick Surtain II | Sophomore | Defensive back |
| Shyheim Carter | Senior | Defensive back |
| Xavier McKinney | Junior | Defensive back |

Special teams

| Player | Class | Position |
|---|---|---|
| Joseph Bulovas | RS Sophomore | Placekicker |
| Trevon Diggs | Senior | Kick returner |

=== Spring game ===
The 2019 Crimson Tide held spring practices in March and April. The 2019 Alabama football spring game, "A-Day" took place in Tuscaloosa, AL on April 13, 2019, at 1 p.m. CST with the White team beating the Crimson team 31–17. Freshman WR John Metchie III was named A-Day MVP after hauling in five catches for a game-high 133 receiving yards. White team QB Mac Jones led all passers, completing 19 of 23 passes for 271 yards.

== Preseason ==
=== Award watch lists ===
Listed in the order that they were released

| Award | Player | Position | Year |
|---|---|---|---|
| Lott Trophy | Dylan Moses | LB | JR |
| Maxwell Award | Tua Tagovailoa | QB | JR |
| Maxwell Award | Najee Harris | RB | JR |
| Maxwell Award | Jerry Jeudy | WR | JR |
| Bednarik Award | Dylan Moses | LB | JR |
| Bednarik Award | Raekwon Davis | DL | SR |
| Davey O'Brien Award | Tua Tagovailoa | QB | JR |
| Doak Walker Award | Najee Harris | RB | JR |
| Biletnikoff Award | Jerry Jeudy | WR | JR |
| Biletnikoff Award | Henry Ruggs | WR | JR |
| Biletnikoff Award | Jaylen Waddle | WR | SO |
| John Mackey Award | Miller Forristall | TE | RS JR |
| Butkus Award | Anfernee Jennings | LB | RS SR |
| Butkus Award | Terrell Lewis | LB | RS SR |
| Butkus Award | Dylan Moses | LB | JR |
| Jim Thorpe Award | Xavier McKinney | DB | JR |
| Outland Trophy | Jedrick Wills | OL | JR |
| Outland Trophy | Alex Leatherwood | OL | JR |
| Bronko Nagurski Trophy | Raekwon Davis | DL | SR |
| Bronko Nagurski Trophy | Trevon Diggs | DB | SR |
| Bronko Nagurski Trophy | Anfernee Jennings | LB | RS SR |
| Bronko Nagurski Trophy | Dylan Moses | LB | JR |
| Dodd Trophy | Nick Saban | HC | -- |
| Wuerffel Trophy | Chris Owens | OL | RS JR |
| Walter Camp Award | Jerry Jeudy | WR | JR |
| Walter Camp Award | Dylan Moses | LB | JR |
| Walter Camp Award | Najee Harris | RB | JR |
| Walter Camp Award | Tua Tagovailoa | QB | JR |
| Polynesian College Football Player Of The Year Award | Tua Tagovailoa | QB | JR |
| Earl Campbell Tyler Rose Award | Jaylen Waddle | WR | SO |
| Johnny Unitas Golden Arm Award | Tua Tagovailoa | QB | JR |
| Manning Award | Tua Tagovailoa | QB | JR |
| Ted Hendricks Award | Raekwon Davis | DE | SR |

=== SEC media days ===
The 2019 SEC Media Days were held July 15–18 in Birmingham, Alabama. In the preseason media poll, Alabama was voted the overwhelming favorite to repeat as West Division champion and SEC champion.

=== Preseason All-SEC teams ===
The Crimson Tide had 13 players at 14 positions selected to the preseason all-SEC teams.

Offense

1st team

Tua Tagovailoa – QB

Najee Harris – RB

Jerry Jeudy – WR

Alex Leatherwood – OL

Jedrick Wills – OL

2nd team

Jaylen Waddle – WR

3rd team

Miller Forristall – TE

Matt Womack – OL

Defense

1st team

Raekwon Davis – DL

Anfernee Jennings – LB

Dylan Moses – LB

Trevon Diggs – DB

2nd team

Patrick Surtain II – DB

Xavier McKinney – DB

3rd team

LaBryan Ray – DL

Terrell Lewis – LB

Shyheim Carter – DB

Specialists

1st team

Jaylen Waddle – all purpose player

Jaylen Waddle – RET

== Schedule ==
Alabama announced its 2019 football schedule on September 18, 2018. The 2019 Crimson Tide' schedule consisted of 7 home games, 4 away games, and 1 neutral site game for the regular season. Alabama hosted four SEC conference opponents Ole Miss (rivalry), Arkansas, Tennessee (Third Saturday of October), and LSU (rivalry) and traveled for four SEC opponents to South Carolina, Texas A&M, Mississippi State (rivalry), and archrival Auburn for the 84th Iron Bowl to close out the SEC regular season on the road. Alabama was not scheduled to play SEC East opponents Florida, Georgia, Kentucky, Missouri, and Vanderbilt in the 2019 regular season. The Crimson Tide's bye week came during week 6 (on October 5) and week 10 (on November 2).

Alabama's out of conference opponents represented the ACC, C-USA, Independents, and Southern. The Crimson Tide hosted three non–conference games which were against New Mexico State of the FBS independents, Southern Miss of Conference USA, and Western Carolina of the SoCon to close out the regular season and traveled to Atlanta, GA for Chick-fil-A Kickoff to host Duke from the ACC.

| Date | Time | Opponent | Rank | Site | TV | Result | Attendance |
|---|---|---|---|---|---|---|---|
| August 31 | 2:30 p.m. | vs. Duke* | No. 2 | Mercedes-Benz Stadium; Atlanta, GA (Chick-fil-A Kickoff) | ABC | W 42–3 | 71,916 |
| September 7 | 3:00 p.m. | New Mexico State* | No. 2 | Bryant–Denny Stadium; Tuscaloosa, AL | SECN | W 62–10 | 100,710 |
| September 14 | 2:30 p.m. | at South Carolina | No. 2 | Williams–Brice Stadium; Columbia, SC | CBS | W 47–23 | 81,954 |
| September 21 | 11:00 a.m. | Southern Miss* | No. 2 | Bryant–Denny Stadium; Tuscaloosa, AL | ESPN2 | W 49–7 | 101,821 |
| September 28 | 2:30 p.m. | Ole Miss | No. 2 | Bryant–Denny Stadium; Tuscaloosa, AL (rivalry) | CBS | W 59–31 | 99,590 |
| October 12 | 2:30 p.m. | at No. 24 Texas A&M | No. 1 | Kyle Field; College Station, TX | CBS | W 47–28 | 106,749 |
| October 19 | 8:00 p.m. | Tennessee | No. 1 | Bryant–Denny Stadium; Tuscaloosa, AL (Third Saturday in October) | ESPN | W 35–13 | 101,821 |
| October 26 | 6:00 p.m. | Arkansas^{†} | No. 1 | Bryant–Denny Stadium; Tuscaloosa, AL | ESPN | W 48–7 | 100,233 |
| November 9 | 2:30 p.m. | No. 2 LSU | No. 3 | Bryant–Denny Stadium; Tuscaloosa, AL (rivalry / SEC Nation / College GameDay) | CBS | L 41–46 | 101,821 |
| November 16 | 11:00 a.m. | at Mississippi State | No. 5 | Davis Wade Stadium; Starkville, MS (rivalry) | ESPN | W 38–7 | 57,607 |
| November 23 | 11:00 a.m. | Western Carolina* | No. 5 | Bryant–Denny Stadium; Tuscaloosa, AL | ESPN | W 66–3 | 101,821 |
| November 30 | 2:30 p.m. | at No. 15 Auburn | No. 5 | Jordan–Hare Stadium; Auburn, AL (Iron Bowl / SEC Nation) | CBS | L 45–48 | 87,451 |
| January 1, 2020 | 12:00 p.m. | vs. No. 14 Michigan* | No. 13 | Camping World Stadium; Orlando, FL (Citrus Bowl / SEC Nation) | ABC | W 35–16 | 59,746 |
*Non-conference game; ^{†}Homecoming; Rankings from AP Poll and CFP Rankings after November 5 released prior to game; All times are in Central time

Schedule source:

== Coaching staff ==
| Name | Position | Consecutive season at Alabama in current position |
|---|---|---|
| Nick Saban | Head coach | 12th |
| Steve Sarkisian | Offensive coordinator/quarterbacks coach | 1st |
| Charles Huff | Associate head coach/Running backs coach | 1st |
| Kyle Flood | Offensive line coach | 1st |
| Holmon Wiggins | Wide receivers coach | 1st |
| Jeff Banks | Special teams coordinator/Tight end coach | 2nd |
| Pete Golding | Defensive coordinator/Inside linebackers coach | 2nd |
| Charles Kelly | Associate Defensive coordinator/Safeties coach | 1st |
| Brian Baker | Associate head coach/Defensive line coach | 1st |
| Sal Sunseri | Outside linebackers coach | 1st |
| Karl Scott | Cornerbacks coach | 2nd |
| Scott Cochran | Strength and conditioning | 12th |

Graduate assistants

- Vinnie Sunseri
- Tino Sunseri
- Andy Kwon

Analysts

- Isaac Shewmaker
- Joe Houston
- Johnathan Galante
- A. J. Milwee
- Alex Mortensen
- Major Applewhite
- Mike Stoops
- Javier Arenas
- Nick Perry
- Dean Altobelli
- Gordon Steele
- Butch Jones
- Rob Ezell
- Patrick Reilly

== Roster ==
2019 Alabama Crimson Tide Football
| Quarterback: 5 Taulia Tagovailoa – Freshman (6'0, 208); 7 Braxton Barker – (redshirt) freshman (6'1, 202); 10 Mac Jones – (redshirt) sophomore (6'2, 205); 13 Tua Tagovailoa – junior (6'1, 218); 15 Paul Tyson – Freshman (6'4, 220); 16 Jayden George – freshman (6'3, 192); 19 Stone Hollenbach - freshman (6'3, 208); Running back: 2 Keilan Robinson – Freshman (5'9, 184); 20 Connor Bishop – freshman (6'1, 195); 22 Najee Harris – junior (6'3, 230); 24 Brian Robinson Jr. – junior (6'1, 226); 26 Trey Sanders – freshman (6'0, 214); 27 Jerome Ford – (redshirt) freshman (5'11, 212); 31 A.J. Gates – freshman (5'7, 170); 35 De'Marquise Lockridge – RS senior (5'11, 216); 39 Jahi Brown – junior (6'0, 223); Wide receiver: 3 John Metchie III – Freshman (6'0, 195); 4 Jerry Jeudy – junior (6'1, 192); 6 DeVonta Smith – junior (6'1, 175); 9 Xavier Williams – (redshirt) freshman (6'1, 195); 11 Henry Ruggs III – junior (6'0, 190); 12 Chadarius Townsend – (redshirt) sophomore (6'0, 194); 14 Tyrell Shavers – (redshirt) sophomore (6'6, 205); 17 Jaylen Waddle – sophomore (5'10, 182); 18 Slade Bolden – (redshirt) Freshman (5'11, 191); 32 Jalen Jackson – (redshirt) senior (6'3, 186); 36 Mac Hereford – senior (6'2, 215); 38 Eric Poellnitz – freshman (5'11, 170); 41 Kyle Smoak – freshman (5'8, 160); 42 Sam Reed – freshman (6'1, 165); 83 John Parker – senior (6'0, 190); 85 Chris Golden – junior (6'5, 207); 86 Connor Adams – senior (6'1, 194); 89 Grant Krieger – freshman (6'2, 192); Placekicker: 16 Will Reichard – Freshman (6'1, 180); 93 Tripp Slyman – sophomore (6'1, 180); 97 Joseph Bulovas – (redshirt) sophomore (6'0, 203); 99 Ty Perine – freshman (6'1, 190); Punter: 12 Skyler DeLong – sophomore (6'4, 188); 95 Jack Martin – freshman (6'0, 206); 98 Mike Bernier – (redshirt) senior (6'2", 215) | Tight end: 19 Jahleel Billingsley – freshman (6'4, 228); 20 Cameron Latu – (redshirt) freshman (6'5", 247); 40 Giles Amos – senior (6'4, 245); 43 Daniel Powell – senior (5'11, 213); 80 Michael Parker – (redshirt) freshman (6'6, 216); 82 Richard Hunt – freshman (6'7, 235); 87 Miller Forristall – (redshirt) junior (6'5, 242); 88 Major Tennison – (redshirt) sophomore (6'5, 248); Offensive lineman: 50 Hunter Brannon – (redshirt) sophomore (6'4, 307); 51 Tanner Bowles – Freshman (6'5, 273); 55 Emil Ekiyor Jr. – (redshirt) freshman (6'3, 327); 60 Kendall Randolph – (redshirt) sophomore (6'5, 296); 62 Jackson Roby – sophomore (6'5", 285); 64 Rowdy Garza – (redshirt) freshman (6'5", 247); 64 Hunter Middleton – freshman (6'3, 260); 65 Deonte Brown – freshman (6'4, 338); 69 Landon Dickerson – (redshirt) junior (6'6, 325); 70 Alex Leatherwood – junior (6'6, 310); 71 Darrian Dalcourt – freshman (6'3, 299); 72 Pierce Quick – freshman (6'5, 291); 73 Evan Neal – freshman (6'7, 360); 74 Jedrick Wills – junior (6'5, 320); 75 Tommy Brown – (redshirt) freshman (6'7, 317); 76 Scott Lashley – (redshirt) junior (6'7, 307); 77 Matt Womack – (redshirt) senior (6'7, 325); 78 Amari Kight – freshman (6'7, 302); 79 Chris Owens – (redshirt) junior (6'3, 315); Defensive lineman: 47 Byron Young – freshman (6'3, 295); 48 Phidarian Mathis – (redshirt) sophomore (6'4, 312); 52 Braylen Ingraham – freshman (6'4, 291); 58 Christian Barmore – (redshirt) freshman (6'5, 310); 89 LaBryan Ray – junior (6'5, 292); 90 Stephon Wynn Jr. – (redshirt) freshman (6'4, 311); 91 Tevita Musika – senior (6'1, 338); 92 Justin Eboigbe – freshman (6'5, 294); 94 D. J. Dale – freshman (6'4, 308); 95 Ishmael Sopsher– freshman (6'4, 334); 96 Taylor Wilson – senior (6'0", 232); 98 Quindarius Watkins – Junior (6'4", 230); 99 Raekwon Davis – senior (6'7, 312) | Linebacker: 1 Ben Davis – (redshirt) junior (6'4, 243); 4 Christopher Allen – (redshirt) sophomore (6'5, 250); 8 Christian Harris – freshman (6'2, 244); 10 Ale Kaho – sophomore (6'1", 228); 23 Jarez Parks – (redshirt) freshman (6'4, 239); 24 Terrell Lewis – (redshirt) Junior (6'5, 252); 30 King Mwikuta – freshman (6'5, 243); 32 Dylan Moses – junior (6'3, 235); 33 Anfernee Jennings – (redshirt) senior (6'3, 259); 35 Shane Lee – freshman (6'0, 246); 36 Markail Benton – (redshirt) sophomore (6'2, 235); 40 Joshua McMillon – (redshirt) senior (6'3, 237); 42 Jaylen Moody – sophomore (6'2, 228); 44 Kevin Harris – freshman (6'4, 222); 51 Wes Baumhower – (redshirt) freshman (6'0", 220); 52 Preston Malone – junior (5'11, 222); 54 Julian Lowenstein – freshman (6'1, 201); 55 William Cooper – junior (6'2, 229); 57 Joe Donald - Senior (6'3, 216); Defensive back: 2 Patrick Surtain II – sophomore (6'2, 203); 3 Daniel Wright – (redshirt) sophomore (6'1, 190); 5 Shyheim Carter – senior (6'0, 191); 7 Trevon Diggs – senior (6'2, 207); 9 Jordan Battle – freshman (6'1, 201); 11 Jeffery Carter – freshman (6'0, 182); 14 Brandon Turnage – freshman (6'1, 185); 15 Xavier McKinney – junior (6'1, 200); 20 D.J. Douglas – freshman (6'0, 202); 21 Jared Mayden – senior (6'0, 205); 22 Jalyn Armour-Davis – (redshirt) freshman (6'1, 182); 25 Eddie Smith – sophomore (6'0, 196); 26 Marcus Banks– freshman (6'0, 170); 27 Joshua Robinson – junior (5'9, 180); 28 Josh Jobe – sophomore (6'1, 189); 29 DeMarcco Hellams – Freshman (6'1, 213); 31 Michael Collins – senior (5'10, 173); 38 Sean Kelly – senior (5'11, 190); 39 Loren Ugheoke – senior (5'10, 183); 43 Christian Swann – junior (5'9, 179); Long snappers: 45 Thomas Fletcher – junior (6'2, 220); 50 Gabe Pugh – freshman (6'5, 273); 59 Jake Hall – (redshirt) freshman (6'3, 194) |
Source and player details, 2019 Alabama Crimson Tide Football Commits (April 24, 2019):

=== Depth chart ===
Projected Depth Chart 2019:

Defense

FS
Xavier McKinney
Jordan Battle
Daniel Wright

| JACK | WILL | MIKE | SAM |
|---|---|---|---|
| Anfernee Jennings | Christian Harris | Shane Lee | Terrell Lewis |
| Ben Davis | Jaylen Moody | Markail Benton | Christopher Allen |
| King Mwikuta | Ale Kaho | ⋅ | ⋅ |

SS
Shyheim Carter
Jared Mayden
DeMarcco Hellams

CB
Trevon Diggs
Jalyn Armour-Davis
Scooby Carter

| DE | NT | DE |
|---|---|---|
| LaBryan Ray | D. J. Dale | Raekwon Davis |
| Justin Eboigbe | Christian Barmore | Phidarian Mathis |
| Byron Young | Tevita Musika | Stephon Wynn |

CB
Patrick Surtain II
Josh Jobe
Marcus Banks

Offense

WR
DeVonta Smith
Tyrell Shavers
Xavier Williams

WR
Jerry Jeudy
Jaylen Waddle
Slade Bolden

| LT | LG | C | RG | RT |
|---|---|---|---|---|
| Alex Leatherwood | Evan Neal | Landon Dickerson | Deonte Brown | Jedrick Wills |
| Scott Lashley | Emil Ekiyor Jr. | Chris Owens | Matt Womack | Tommy Brown |
| ⋅ | ⋅ | Darrian Dalcourt | Kendall Randolph | Pierce Quick |

TE
Miller Forristall
Major Tennison
Jahleel Billingsley

WR
Henry Ruggs
John Metchie III
⋅

QB
Tua Tagovailoa
Mac Jones
Paul Tyson

Key reserves
Season-ending injury
Joshua McMillon (knee)
Dylan Moses (knee)
Trey Sanders (foot)
Suspension

RB
Najee Harris
Brian Robinson Jr.
Jerome Ford

Special teams
PK Joseph Bulovas
Will Reichard
P Ty Perine
KR Henry Ruggs III
Trevon Diggs
Jaylen Waddle
Najee Harris
Brian Robinson
PR Jaylen Waddle
Trevon Diggs
LS Thomas Fletcher
H Mac Jones

True Freshman
Double Position : *

== Game summaries ==
=== vs Duke Blue Devils ===
Chick-fil-A Kickoff

| Team | 1 | 2 | 3 | 4 | Total |
|---|---|---|---|---|---|
| Duke | 0 | 3 | 0 | 0 | 3 |
| • No. 2 Alabama | 0 | 14 | 21 | 7 | 42 |

- Date: August 31
- Location: Atlanta, GA
- Game start: 3:35 p.m.
- Game attendance: 71,916
- Game weather: Indoors
- Referee: Dan Capron
- TV announcers (ABC): Steve Levy (play-by-play), Brian Griese (color), Todd McShay & Molly McGrath (sideline)

Scoring summary
| 2 | 10:02 | BAMA | Tagovailoa 27 pass to Forristal, Reichard kick | BAMA 7–0 |
| 2 | 5:13 | BAMA | Robinson Jr. 1 rush, Reichard kick | BAMA 14–0 |
| 2 | 0:11 | DUKE | Reed 30 field goal | BAMA 14–3 |
| 3 | 8:34 | BAMA | Tagovailoa 1 pass to Tennison, Reichard kick | BAMA 21–3 |
| 3 | 7:32 | BAMA | Tagovailoa 8 pass to Smith, Reichard kick | BAMA 28–3 |
| 3 | 1:36 | BAMA | Tagovailoa 21 pass to Jeudy, Reichard kick | BAMA 35–3 |
| 4 | 4:51 | BAMA | Ford 37 rush, Reichard kick | BAMA 42–3 |

Statistics

| Statistics | Duke | Alabama |
|---|---|---|
| First downs | 11 | 30 |
| Total yards | 204 | 512 |
| Rushing yards | 107 | 145 |
| Passing yards | 97 | 367 |
| Turnovers | 3 | 1 |
| Time of possession | 23:23 | 36:37 |

| Team | Category | Player | Statistics |
|---|---|---|---|
| Duke | Passing | Quentin Harris | 12–22, 97 yards, 2 INTs |
| Duke | Rushing | Brittain Brown | 7 carries, 36 yards |
| Duke | Receiving | Noah Gray | 5 receptions, 45 yards |
| Alabama | Passing | Tua Tagovailoa | 26–31, 336 yards, 4 TDs |
| Alabama | Rushing | Jerome Ford | 10 carries, 64 yards, 1 TD |
| Alabama | Receiving | Jerry Jeudy | 10 receptions, 137 yards, 1 TD |

=== New Mexico State Aggies ===
| Team | 1 | 2 | 3 | 4 | Total |
|---|---|---|---|---|---|
| New Mexico State | 0 | 0 | 7 | 3 | 10 |
| • No. 2 Alabama | 21 | 17 | 24 | 0 | 62 |

- Date: September 7
- Location: Tuscaloosa, AL
- Game start: 3:01 p.m.
- Game attendance: 100,710
- Game weather: 94, Sunny and hot, Wind WNW @ 7 mph
- Referee: Ken Williamson
- TV announcers (SEC Network): Taylor Zarzour (play-by-play), Matt Stinchcomb (color), Alyssa Lang (sideline)

Scoring summary
| 1 | 14:47 | BAMA | Ruggs III 75 rush, Reichard kick | BAMA 7–0 |
| 1 | 9:08 | BAMA | Tagovailoa 21 pass to Jeudy, Reichard kick | BAMA 14–0 |
| 1 | 0:00 | BAMA | Tagovailoa 23 pass to Jeudy, Reichard kick | BAMA 21–0 |
| 2 | 10:08 | BAMA | Tagovailoa 10 pass to Ruggs III, Reichard kick | BAMA 28–0 |
| 2 | 3:49 | BAMA | Tagovailoa 25 rush, Reichard kick | BAMA 35–0 |
| 2 | 1:04 | BAMA | Reichard 48 field goal | BAMA 38–0 |
| 3 | 8:20 | BAMA | Harris 8 rush, Reichard kick | BAMA 45–0 |
| 3 | 5:59 | NMSU | Adkins 4 pass to Huntley, Brown kick | BAMA 45–7 |
| 3 | 3:19 | BAMA | Jones 19 pass to Jeudy, Reichard kick | BAMA 52–7 |
| 3 | 1:40 | BAMA | Reichard 49 field goal | BAMA 55–7 |
| 3 | 0:13 | BAMA | Robinson 74 rush, Reichard kick | BAMA 62–7 |
| 4 | 10:00 | NMSU | Brown 43 field goal | BAMA 62–10 |

Statistics

| Statistics | New Mexico State | Alabama |
|---|---|---|
| First downs | 14 | 23 |
| Total yards | 262 | 603 |
| Rushing yards | 101 | 318 |
| Passing yards | 161 | 285 |
| Turnovers | 2 | 0 |
| Time of possession | 32:03 | 27:57 |

| Team | Category | Player | Statistics |
|---|---|---|---|
| New Mexico State | Passing | Josh Adkins | 19–30, 145 yards, 1 TD, 1 INT |
| New Mexico State | Rushing | Josh Foley | 7 carries, 51 yards |
| New Mexico State | Receiving | Tony Nicholson | 2 receptions, 44 yards |
| Alabama | Passing | Tua Tagovailoa | 16–24, 227 yards, 3 TDs |
| Alabama | Rushing | Keilan Robinson | 5 carries, 83 yards, 1 TD |
| Alabama | Receiving | Jerry Jeudy | 8 receptions, 103 yards, 3 TDs |

=== At South Carolina Gamecocks ===
| Team | 1 | 2 | 3 | 4 | Total |
|---|---|---|---|---|---|
| • No. 2 Alabama | 14 | 10 | 10 | 13 | 47 |
| South Carolina | 10 | 0 | 3 | 10 | 23 |

- Date: September 14
- Location: Columbia, SC
- Game start: 3:39 p.m.
- Game attendance: 81,954
- Game weather: 88, Cloudy, Wind ENE @ 6 mph
- Referee: Hubert Owens
- TV announcers (CBS): Brad Nessler (play-by-play), Gary Danielson (color), Jamie Erdahl (sideline)

Scoring summary
| 1 | 13:21 | BAMA | Tagovailoa 24 pass to Harris, Reichard kick | BAMA 7–0 |
| 1 | 8:31 | USC | White 44 field goal | BAMA 7–3 |
| 1 | 3:15 | BAMA | Tagovailoa 81 pass to Ruggs | BAMA 14–3 |
| 1 | 1:49 | USC | Hilinski 31 pass to Smith, White kick | BAMA 14–10 |
| 2 | 13:10 | BAMA | Reichard 23 field goal | BAMA 17–10 |
| 2 | 7:40 | BAMA | Tagovailoa 42 pass to Harris, Reichard kick | BAMA 24–10 |
| 3 | 11:26 | USC | White 28 field goal | BAMA 24–13 |
| 3 | 9:52 | BAMA | Tagovailoa 42 pass to Smith, Reichard kick | BAMA 31–13 |
| 3 | 0:52 | BAMA | Reichard 21 field goal | BAMA 34–13 |
| 4 | 14:49 | USC | White 48 field goal | BAMA 34–16 |
| 4 | 13:41 | BAMA | Tagovailoa 11 pass to Smith, kick failed | BAMA 40–16 |
| 4 | 2:04 | BAMA | Jones 1 rush, Reichard kick | BAMA 47–16 |
| 4 | 0:11 | USC | Hilinski 11 pass to Markway, White kick | BAMA 47–23 |

Statistics

| Statistics | Alabama | South Carolina |
|---|---|---|
| First downs | 25 | 31 |
| Total yards | 571 | 459 |
| Rushing yards | 76 | 135 |
| Passing yards | 495 | 324 |
| Turnovers | 0 | 2 |
| Time of possession | 32:37 | 27:23 |

| Team | Category | Player | Statistics |
|---|---|---|---|
| Alabama | Passing | Tua Tagovailoa | 28–36, 444 yards, 5 TDs |
| Alabama | Rushing | Najee Harris | 7 carries, 36 yards |
| Alabama | Receiving | DeVonta Smith | 8 receptions, 136 yards, 2 TDs |
| South Carolina | Passing | Ryan Hilinski | 36–57, 324 yards, 2 TDs, 1 INT |
| South Carolina | Rushing | Rico Dowdle | 12 carries, 102 yards |
| South Carolina | Receiving | Shi Smith | 6 receptions, 90 yards, 1 TD |

=== Southern Miss Golden Eagles ===
| Team | 1 | 2 | 3 | 4 | Total |
|---|---|---|---|---|---|
| Southern Miss | 0 | 7 | 0 | 0 | 7 |
| • No. 2 Alabama | 14 | 14 | 14 | 7 | 49 |

- Date: September 21
- Location: Tuscaloosa, AL
- Game start: 11:01 a.m.
- Game attendance: 101,821
- Game weather: 82, Partly cloudy, Wind SSE @ 7 mph
- Referee: Matt Loeffler
- TV announcers (ESPN2): Roy Philpott (play-by-play), Kelly Stouffer (color), Lauren Sisler (sideline)

Scoring summary
| 1 | 12:08 | BAMA | Tagovailoa 45 pass to Ruggs, Reichard kick | BAMA 7–0 |
| 1 | 6:04 | BAMA | Tagovailoa 74 pass to Ruggs, Reichard kick | BAMA 14–0 |
| 2 | 14:17 | BAMA | Tagovailoa 5 pass to Harris, Bulovas kick | BAMA 21–0 |
| 2 | 10:55 | BAMA | Tagovailoa 17 pass to Jeudy, Bulovas kick | BAMA 28–0 |
| 2 | 1:02 | USM | Abraham 4 pass to Harris, Stein kick | BAMA 28–7 |
| 3 | 13:12 | BAMA | Tagovailoa 20 pass to Jeudy, Bulovas kick | BAMA 35–7 |
| 3 | 5:43 | BAMA | Robinson Jr. 6 rush, Bulovas kick | BAMA 42–7 |
| 4 | 1:37 | BAMA | Ford 5 rush, Bulovas kick | BAMA 49–7 |

Statistics

| Statistics | Southern Miss | Alabama |
|---|---|---|
| First downs | 15 | 24 |
| Total yards | 226 | 514 |
| Rushing yards | 52 | 176 |
| Passing yards | 174 | 338 |
| Turnovers | 2 | 1 |
| Time of possession | 32:55 | 27:05 |

| Team | Category | Player | Statistics |
|---|---|---|---|
| Southern Miss | Passing | Jack Abraham | 17–26, 174 yards, 1 TD, 1 INT |
| Southern Miss | Rushing | DeMichael Harris | 8 carries, 34 yards |
| Southern Miss | Receiving | DeMichael Harris | 3 receptions, 50 yards, 1 TD |
| Alabama | Passing | Tua Tagovailoa | 17–21, 293 yards, 5 TDs |
| Alabama | Rushing | Najee Harris | 14 carries, 110 yards |
| Alabama | Receiving | Henry Ruggs | 4 receptions, 148 yards, 2 TDs |

=== Ole Miss Rebels ===
| Team | 1 | 2 | 3 | 4 | Total |
|---|---|---|---|---|---|
| Ole Miss | 10 | 0 | 7 | 14 | 31 |
| • No. 2 Alabama | 7 | 31 | 14 | 7 | 59 |

- Date: September 28
- Location: Tuscaloosa, AL
- Game start: 2:39 p.m.
- Game attendance: 99,590
- Game weather: 91, Sunny skies, Wind WSW @ 3 mph
- Referee: Ken Williamson
- TV announcers (CBS): Brad Nessler (play-by-play), Gary Danielson (color), Jamie Erdahl (sideline)

Scoring summary
| 1 | 13:50 | BAMA | Tagovailoa 74 pass to Smith, Bulovas kick | BAMA 7–0 |
| 1 | 10:20 | MISS | Plumlee 1 rush, Logan kick | Tied 7–7 |
| 1 | 2:36 | MISS | Logan 33 field goal | MISS 10–7 |
| 2 | 13:52 | BAMA | Tagovailoa 7 rush, Bulovas kick | BAMA 14–10 |
| 2 | 9:51 | BAMA | Bulovas 36 field goal | BAMA 17–10 |
| 2 | 6:01 | BAMA | Tagovailoa 25 pass to Smith, Bulovas kick | BAMA 24–10 |
| 2 | 2:45 | BAMA | Tagovailoa 23 pass to Smith, Bulovas kick | BAMA 31–10 |
| 2 | 1:23 | BAMA | Tagovailoa 33 pass to Smith, Bulovas kick | BAMA 38–10 |
| 3 | 10:49 | BAMA | Tagovailoa 27 pass to Smith, Bulovas kick | BAMA 45–10 |
| 3 | 8:29 | MISS | Plumlee 9 pass to Ealy, Logan kick | BAMA 45–17 |
| 3 | 5:29 | BAMA | Kaho punt block recovery in end zone, Bulovas kick | BAMA 52–17 |
| 4 | 13:23 | MISS | Plumlee 26 pass to Mingo, Logan kick | BAMA 52–24 |
| 4 | 7:57 | BAMA | Tagovailoa 19 pass to Forristall, Bulovas kick | BAMA 59–24 |
| 4 | 0:05 | MISS | Tisdale 28 pass to Jackson, Logan kick | BAMA 59–31 |

Statistics

| Statistics | Ole Miss | Alabama |
|---|---|---|
| First downs | 25 | 29 |
| Total yards | 476 | 573 |
| Rushing yards | 279 | 155 |
| Passing yards | 197 | 418 |
| Turnovers | 1 | 1 |
| Time of possession | 30:23 | 29:37 |

| Team | Category | Player | Statistics |
|---|---|---|---|
| Ole Miss | Passing | John Rhys Plumlee | 10–28, 141 yards, 2 TDs, 1 INT |
| Ole Miss | Rushing | John Rhys Plumlee | 25 carries, 109 yards, 1 TD |
| Ole Miss | Receiving | Jonathan Mingo | 3 receptions, 74 yards, 1 TD |
| Alabama | Passing | Tua Tagovailoa | 26–36, 418 yards, 6 TDs |
| Alabama | Rushing | Najee Harris | 9 carries, 71 yards |
| Alabama | Receiving | DeVonta Smith | 11 receptions, 274 yards, 5 TDs |

=== At No. 24 Texas A&M Aggies ===
| Team | 1 | 2 | 3 | 4 | Total |
|---|---|---|---|---|---|
| • No. 1 Alabama | 14 | 10 | 10 | 13 | 47 |
| No. 24 Texas A&M | 7 | 6 | 7 | 8 | 28 |

- Date: October 12
- Location: College Station, TX
- Game start: 2:39 p.m.
- Game attendance: 106,749
- Game weather: 64, Partly cloudy, Wind N @ 10 mph
- Referee: Matt Loeffler
- TV announcers (CBS): Brad Nessler (play-by-play), Gary Danielson (color), Jamie Erdahl (sideline)

Scoring summary
| 1 | 6:57 | TAMU | Mond 1 rush, Small kick | TAMU 7–0 |
| 1 | 2:41 | BAMA | Tagovailoa 31 pass to Waddle, Bulovas kick | Tied 7–7 |
| 1 | 0:24 | BAMA | Tagovailoa 47 pass to Smith, Bulovas kick | BAMA 14–7 |
| 2 | 12:12 | TAMU | Small 31 field goal | BAMA 14–10 |
| 2 | 8:49 | BAMA | Bulovas 35 field goal | BAMA 17–10 |
| 2 | 5:28 | BAMA | Tagovailoa 16 pass to Harris, Bulovas kick | BAMA 24–10 |
| 2 | 0:00 | TAMU | Small 32 field goal | BAMA 24–13 |
| 3 | 10:53 | BAMA | Bulovas 27 field goal | BAMA 27–13 |
| 3 | 7:35 | BAMA | Tagovailoa 33 pass to Ruggs, Bulovas kick | BAMA 34–13 |
| 3 | 5:06 | TAMU | Mond 25 pass to Wydermyer, Small kick | BAMA 34–20 |
| 4 | 13:02 | BAMA | Robinson Jr. 2 rush, kick blocked | BAMA 40–20 |
| 4 | 11:30 | BAMA | Shavers 2 punt block return, Bulovas kick | BAMA 47–20 |
| 4 | 8:48 | TAMU | Mond 18 pass to Wydermyer, 2-pt. pass good | BAMA 47–28 |

Statistics

| Statistics | Alabama | Texas A&M |
|---|---|---|
| First downs | 25 | 24 |
| Total yards | 448 | 389 |
| Rushing yards | 155 | 125 |
| Passing yards | 293 | 264 |
| Turnovers | 1 | 1 |
| Time of possession | 30:56 | 29:04 |

| Team | Category | Player | Statistics |
|---|---|---|---|
| Alabama | Passing | Tua Tagovailoa | 21–34, 293 yards, 4 TDs, 1 INT |
| Alabama | Rushing | Najee Harris | 20 carries, 114 yards |
| Alabama | Receiving | DeVonta Smith | 7 receptions, 99 yards, 1 TD |
| Texas A&M | Passing | Kellen Mond | 24–42, 264 yards, 2 TDs |
| Texas A&M | Rushing | Kellen Mond | 16 carries, 90 yards, 1 TD |
| Texas A&M | Receiving | Quartney Davis | 7 receptions, 81 yards |

=== Tennessee Volunteers ===
Third Saturday in October

| Team | 1 | 2 | 3 | 4 | Total |
|---|---|---|---|---|---|
| Tennessee | 7 | 3 | 3 | 0 | 13 |
| • No. 1 Alabama | 14 | 7 | 7 | 7 | 35 |

- Date: October 19
- Location: Tuscaloosa, AL
- Game start: 8:11 p.m.
- Game attendance: 101,821
- Game weather: 61, Cloudy, Wind NE @ 6 mph
- Referee: Hubert Owens
- TV announcers (ESPN): Steve Levy (play-by-play), Brian Griese (color), Todd McShay & Molly McGrath (sideline)

Scoring summary
| 1 | 11:22 | BAMA | Harris 1 rush, Bulovas kick | BAMA 7–0 |
| 1 | 4:21 | TENN | Maurer 2 rush, Cimaglia kick | Tied 7–7 |
| 1 | 1:35 | BAMA | Robinson Jr. 9 rush, Bulovas kick | BAMA 14–7 |
| 2 | 11:54 | TENN | Cimaglia 37 field goal | BAMA 14–10 |
| 2 | 9:02 | BAMA | Harris 1 rush, Bulovas kick | BAMA 21–10 |
| 3 | 8:32 | TENN | Cimaglia 32 field goal | BAMA 21–13 |
| 3 | 4:55 | BAMA | Bolden 6 pass to Forristall, Bulovas kick | BAMA 28–13 |
| 4 | 7:21 | BAMA | Diggs 100 fumble return, Bulovas kick | BAMA 35–13 |

Statistics

| Statistics | Tennessee | Alabama |
|---|---|---|
| First downs | 18 | 23 |
| Total yards | 231 | 373 |
| Rushing yards | 114 | 140 |
| Passing yards | 117 | 233 |
| Turnovers | 2 | 1 |
| Time of possession | 31:44 | 28:16 |

| Team | Category | Player | Statistics |
|---|---|---|---|
| Tennessee | Passing | Brian Maurer | 5–7, 62 yards, 1 INT |
| Tennessee | Rushing | Tim Jordan | 17 carries, 94 yards |
| Tennessee | Receiving | Jauan Jennings | 6 receptions, 66 yards |
| Alabama | Passing | Tua Tagovailoa | 11–12, 155 yards, 1 INT |
| Alabama | Rushing | Najee Harris | 21 carries, 105 yards, 2 TDs |
| Alabama | Receiving | Henry Ruggs | 4 receptions, 72 yards |

=== Arkansas Razorbacks ===
| Team | 1 | 2 | 3 | 4 | Total |
|---|---|---|---|---|---|
| Arkansas | 0 | 0 | 0 | 7 | 7 |
| • No. 1 Alabama | 17 | 24 | 7 | 0 | 48 |

- Date: October 26
- Location: Tuscaloosa, AL
- Game start: 6:05 p.m.
- Game attendance: 100,233
- Game weather: 71, Partly cloudy skies, Wind SW @ 11 mph
- Referee: Marc Curles
- TV announcers (ESPN): Dave Pasch (play-by-play), Greg McElroy (color), Tom Luginbill (sideline)

Scoring summary
| 1 | 5:53 | BAMA | Bulovas 31 field goal | BAMA 3–0 |
| 1 | 4:03 | BAMA | Jones 14 pass to Ruggs, Bulovas kick | BAMA 10–0 |
| 1 | 0:34 | BAMA | Jones 14 pass to Jeudy, Bulovas kick | BAMA 17–0 |
| 2 | 12:25 | BAMA | Harris 1 rush, Bulovas kick | BAMA 24–0 |
| 2 | 9:57 | BAMA | Harris 1 rush, Bulovas kick | BAMA 31–0 |
| 2 | 2:36 | BAMA | Bulovas 30 field goal | BAMA 34–0 |
| 2 | 0:07 | BAMA | Diggs 84 INT return, Bulovas kick | BAMA 41–0 |
| 3 | 12:38 | BAMA | Jones 40 pass to Jeudy, Bulovas kick | BAMA 48–0 |
| 4 | 14:52 | ARK | Jones 8 pass to O'Grady, Limpert kick | BAMA 48–7 |

Statistics

| Statistics | Arkansas | Alabama |
|---|---|---|
| First downs | 13 | 23 |
| Total yards | 213 | 459 |
| Rushing yards | 106 | 179 |
| Passing yards | 107 | 280 |
| Turnovers | 4 | 0 |
| Time of possession | 25:26 | 34:34 |

| Team | Category | Player | Statistics |
|---|---|---|---|
| Arkansas | Passing | Nick Starkel | 5–19, 58 yards, 3 INTs |
| Arkansas | Rushing | Rakeem Boyd | 12 carries, 50 yards |
| Arkansas | Receiving | Rakeem Boyd | 4 receptions, 55 yards |
| Alabama | Passing | Mac Jones | 18–22, 235 yards, 3 TDs |
| Alabama | Rushing | Najee Harris | 13 carries, 86 yards, 2 TDs |
| Alabama | Receiving | Jerry Jeudy | 7 receptions, 103 yards, 2 TDs |

=== No. 2 LSU Tigers ===
| Team | 1 | 2 | 3 | 4 | Total |
|---|---|---|---|---|---|
| • No. 2 LSU | 10 | 23 | 0 | 13 | 46 |
| No. 3 Alabama | 7 | 6 | 7 | 21 | 41 |

- Date: November 9
- Location: Tuscaloosa, AL
- Game start: 2:42 p.m.
- Game attendance: 101,821
- Game weather: 57, Sunny skies, Wind W @ 3 mph
- Referee: John McDaid
- TV announcers (CBS): Brad Nessler (play-by-play), Gary Danielson (color), Jamie Erdahl (sideline)

Scoring summary
| 1 | 9:15 | LSU | Burrow 33 pass to Chase, York kick | LSU 7–0 |
| 1 | 4:54 | LSU | York 40 field goal | LSU 10–0 |
| 1 | 1:14 | BAMA | Waddle 77 punt return, Bulovas kick | LSU 10–7 |
| 2 | 13:03 | LSU | Burrow 29 pass to Marshall Jr., kick blocked | LSU 16–7 |
| 2 | 6:43 | BAMA | Tagovailoa 64 pass to Smith | LSU 16–13 |
| 2 | 4:20 | LSU | York 45 field goal | LSU 19–13 |
| 2 | 0:26 | LSU | Edwards-Helaire 1 rush, York kick | LSU 26–13 |
| 2 | 0:06 | LSU | Burrow 13 pass to Edwards-Helaire, York kick | LSU 33–13 |
| 3 | 4:51 | BAMA | Tagovailoa 15 pass to Harris, Bulovas kick | LSU 33–20 |
| 4 | 14:33 | BAMA | Harris 1 rush, Bulovas kick | LSU 33–27 |
| 4 | 10:07 | LSU | Edwards-Helaire 5 rush, 2-pt. pass failed | LSU 39–27 |
| 4 | 5:32 | BAMA | Tagovailoa 5 pass to Jeudy, Bulovas kick | LSU 39–34 |
| 4 | 1:37 | LSU | Edwards-Helaire 7 rush, York kick | LSU 46–34 |
| 4 | 1:21 | BAMA | Tagovailoa 85 pass to Smith, Bulovas kick | LSU 46–41 |

Statistics

| Statistics | LSU | Alabama |
|---|---|---|
| First downs | 29 | 22 |
| Total yards | 559 | 541 |
| Rushing yards | 166 | 123 |
| Passing yards | 393 | 418 |
| Turnovers | 1 | 2 |
| Time of possession | 34:34 | 25:26 |

| Team | Category | Player | Statistics |
|---|---|---|---|
| LSU | Passing | Joe Burrow | 31–39, 393 yards, 3 TDs |
| LSU | Rushing | Clyde Edwards-Helaire | 20 carries, 103 yards, 3 TDs |
| LSU | Receiving | Ja'Marr Chase | 6 receptions, 140 yards, 1 TD |
| Alabama | Passing | Tua Tagovailoa | 21–40, 418 yards, 4 TDs, 1 INT |
| Alabama | Rushing | Najee Harris | 19 carries, 146 yards, 1 TD |
| Alabama | Receiving | DeVonta Smith | 7 receptions, 213 yards, 2 TDs |

=== At Mississippi State Bulldogs ===
| Team | 1 | 2 | 3 | 4 | Total |
|---|---|---|---|---|---|
| • No. 5 Alabama | 21 | 14 | 3 | 0 | 38 |
| Mississippi State | 7 | 0 | 0 | 0 | 7 |

- Date: November 16
- Location: Starkville, MS
- Game start: 11:02 a.m.
- Game attendance: 57,607
- Game weather: 46, clear skies, Wind N @ 6 mph
- Referee: Ken Williamson
- TV announcers (ESPN): Steve Levy (play-by-play), Brian Griese (color), Todd McShay & Molly McGrath (sideline)

Scoring summary
| 1 | 13:08 | BAMA | Harris 10 rush, Bulovas kick | BAMA 7–0 |
| 1 | 12:54 | BAMA | Tagovailoa 19 pass to Harris, Bulovas kick | BAMA 14–0 |
| 1 | 8:37 | MSST | Hill 1 rush, Christmann kick | BAMA 14–7 |
| 1 | 3:22 | BAMA | Harris 5 rush, Bulovas kick | BAMA 21–7 |
| 2 | 14:15 | BAMA | Tagovailoa 35 pass to Waddle, Bulovas kick | BAMA 28–7 |
| 2 | 6:08 | BAMA | Harris 5 rush, Bulovas kick | BAMA 35–7 |
| 3 | 7:28 | BAMA | Bulovas 22 field goal | BAMA 38–7 |

Statistics

| Statistics | Alabama | Mississippi State |
|---|---|---|
| First downs | 24 | 11 |
| Total yards | 510 | 270 |
| Rushing yards | 160 | 188 |
| Passing yards | 350 | 82 |
| Turnovers | 0 | 1 |
| Time of possession | 27:57 | 32:03 |

| Team | Category | Player | Statistics |
|---|---|---|---|
| Alabama | Passing | Tua Tagovailoa | 14–18, 256 yards, 2 TDs |
| Alabama | Rushing | Najee Harris | 17 carries, 88 yards, 3 TDs |
| Alabama | Receiving | Jerry Jeudy | 7 receptions, 114 yards |
| Mississippi State | Passing | Tommy Stevens | 12–21, 82 yards, 1 INT |
| Mississippi State | Rushing | Tommy Stevens | 10 carries, 96 yards |
| Mississippi State | Receiving | Farrod Green | 1 reception, 30 yards |

=== Western Carolina Catamounts ===
| Team | 1 | 2 | 3 | 4 | Total |
|---|---|---|---|---|---|
| Western Carolina | 0 | 0 | 0 | 3 | 3 |
| • No. 5 Alabama | 17 | 21 | 21 | 7 | 66 |

- Date: November 23
- Location: Tuscaloosa, AL
- Game start: 11:02 a.m.
- Game attendance: 101,821
- Game weather: 59, Cloudy skies, Wind W @ 10 mph
- Referee: Lee Hedrick
- TV announcers (ESPN): Roy Philpott (play-by-play), Kelly Stouffer (color), Lauren Sisler (sideline)

Scoring summary
| 1 | 11:44 | BAMA | Bulovas 29 field goal | BAMA 3–0 |
| 1 | 9:00 | BAMA | Jones 57 pass to Smith, Bulovas kick | BAMA 10–0 |
| 1 | 5:33 | BAMA | McKinney 81 INT return, Bulovas kick | BAMA 17–0 |
| 2 | 11:29 | BAMA | Robinson Jr. 5 rush, Bulovas kick | BAMA 24–0 |
| 2 | 7:36 | BAMA | Jones 12 pass to Harris, Bulovas kick | BAMA 31–0 |
| 2 | 4:08 | BAMA | Jones 54 pass to Waddle, Bulovas kick | BAMA 38–0 |
| 3 | 13:41 | BAMA | Harris 3 rush, Bulovas kick | BAMA 45–0 |
| 3 | 10:32 | BAMA | Tau. Tagovailoa 15 pass to Smith | BAMA 52–0 |
| 3 | 6:02 | BAMA | Robinson 46 rush, Bulovas kick | BAMA 59–0 |
| 4 | 14:56 | WCU | Pletz 38 field goal | BAMA 59–3 |
| 4 | 8:13 | BAMA | Ford 6 rush, Bulovas kick | BAMA 66–3 |

Statistics

| Statistics | Western Carolina | Alabama |
|---|---|---|
| First downs | 10 | 23 |
| Total yards | 179 | 541 |
| Rushing yards | 67 | 231 |
| Passing yards | 112 | 310 |
| Turnovers | 5 | 1 |
| Time of possession | 32:09 | 27:51 |

| Team | Category | Player | Statistics |
|---|---|---|---|
| Western Carolina | Passing | Tyrie Adams | 10–19, 112 yards, 4 INTs |
| Western Carolina | Rushing | Donnavan Spencer | 15 carries, 39 yards |
| Western Carolina | Receiving | Owen Cosenke | 4 receptions, 46 yards |
| Alabama | Passing | Mac Jones | 10–12, 275 yards, 3 TDs |
| Alabama | Rushing | Keilan Robinson | 8 carries, 92 yards, 1 TD |
| Alabama | Receiving | Jaylen Waddle | 3 receptions, 101 yards, 1 TD |

=== At No. 15 Auburn Tigers ===
Iron Bowl

| Team | 1 | 2 | 3 | 4 | Total |
|---|---|---|---|---|---|
| No. 5 Alabama | 3 | 28 | 7 | 7 | 45 |
| • No. 15 Auburn | 7 | 20 | 13 | 8 | 48 |

- Date: November 30
- Location: Auburn, AL
- Game start: 2:39 p.m.
- Game attendance: 87,451
- Game weather: 75, Sunny, Wind SW @ 11 mph
- Referee: Ken Williamson
- TV announcers (CBS): Brad Nessler (play-by-play), Gary Danielson (color), Jamie Erdahl (sideline)

Scoring summary
| 1 | 8:27 | BAMA | Bulovas 43 field goal | BAMA 3–0 |
| 1 | 2:07 | AUB | Nix 7 rush, Carlson kick | AUB 7–3 |
| 2 | 10:16 | BAMA | Harris 6 rush, Bulovas kick | BAMA 10–7 |
| 2 | 7:04 | AUB | Carlson 43 field goal | Tied 10–10 |
| 2 | 5:36 | AUB | Monday 29 INT return, Carlson kick | AUB 17–10 |
| 2 | 5:22 | BAMA | Waddle 98 kickoff return, Bulovas kick | Tied 17–17 |
| 2 | 4:12 | BAMA | Jones 3 pass to Ruggs, Bulovas kick | BAMA 24–17 |
| 2 | 1:06 | AUB | Nix 14 pass to Cannella, Carlson kick | Tied 24–24 |
| 2 | 0:33 | BAMA | Jones 58 pass to Waddle, Bulovas kick | BAMA 31–24 |
| 2 | 0:00 | AUB | Carlson 52 field goal | BAMA 31–27 |
| 3 | 11:49 | AUB | Carlson 43 field goal | BAMA 31–30 |
| 3 | 6:31 | AUB | McClain 100 INT return, Carlson kick | AUB 37–31 |
| 3 | 4:57 | BAMA | Jones 12 pass to Waddle, Bulovas kick | BAMA 38–37 |
| 3 | 0:49 | AUB | Carlson 44 field goal | AUB 40–38 |
| 4 | 13:44 | BAMA | Jones 28 pass to Waddle, Bulovas kick | BAMA 45–40 |
| 4 | 8:08 | AUB | Shivers 11 rush, 2-pt. pass good | AUB 48–45 |

Statistics

| Statistics | Alabama | Auburn |
|---|---|---|
| First downs | 28 | 23 |
| Total yards | 515 | 354 |
| Rushing yards | 180 | 181 |
| Passing yards | 335 | 173 |
| Turnovers | 2 | 1 |
| Time of possession | 35:52 | 24:08 |

| Team | Category | Player | Statistics |
|---|---|---|---|
| Alabama | Passing | Mac Jones | 26–39, 335 yards, 4 TDs, 2 INTs |
| Alabama | Rushing | Najee Harris | 27 carries, 146 yards, 1 TD |
| Alabama | Receiving | Henry Ruggs | 6 receptions, 99 yards, 1 TD |
| Auburn | Passing | Bo Nix | 15–30, 173 yards, 1 TD |
| Auburn | Rushing | Jatarvious Whitlow | 16 carries, 114 yards |
| Auburn | Receiving | Seth Williams | 3 receptions, 66 yards |

=== vs No. 14 Michigan Wolverines ===
Vrbo Citrus Bowl

| Team | 1 | 2 | 3 | 4 | Total |
|---|---|---|---|---|---|
| No. 14 Michigan | 10 | 6 | 0 | 0 | 16 |
| • No. 13 Alabama | 7 | 7 | 7 | 14 | 35 |

- Date: January 1, 2020
- Location: Orlando, FL
- Game start: 1:07 p.m.
- Game attendance: 59,746
- Game weather: 66, Mostly sunny, clear, Wind NNW @ 5 mph
- Referee: M Mothershed
- TV announcers (ABC): Dave Pasch (play-by-play), Greg McElroy (color), Tom Luginbill (sideline)

Scoring summary
| 1 | 13:47 | BAMA | Jones 85 pass to Jeudy, Bulovas kick | BAMA 7–0 |
| 1 | 7:06 | MICH | Patterson 7 pass to Eubanks, Turner kick | Tied 7–7 |
| 1 | 0:09 | MICH | Nordin 36 field goal | MICH 10–7 |
| 2 | 7:16 | MICH | Nordin 42 field goal | MICH 13–7 |
| 2 | 3:32 | BAMA | Harris 9 rush, Bulovas kick | BAMA 14–13 |
| 2 | 0:00 | MICH | Nordin 57 field goal | MICH 16–14 |
| 3 | 13:30 | BAMA | Jones 42 pass to Smith, Bulovas kick | BAMA 21–16 |
| 4 | 10:01 | BAMA | Jones 20 pass to Forristall, Bulovas kick | BAMA 28–16 |
| 4 | 0:26 | BAMA | Harris 2 rush, Bulovas kick | BAMA 35–16 |

Statistics

| Statistics | Michigan | Alabama |
|---|---|---|
| First downs | 23 | 20 |
| Total yards | 395 | 480 |
| Rushing yards | 162 | 153 |
| Passing yards | 233 | 327 |
| Turnovers | 2 | 0 |
| Time of possession | 34:47 | 25:13 |

| Team | Category | Player | Statistics |
|---|---|---|---|
| Michigan | Passing | Shea Patterson | 17–37, 233 yards, 1 TD, 2 INT |
| Michigan | Rushing | Zach Charbonnet | 13 carries, 84 yards |
| Michigan | Receiving | Giles Jackson | 4 receptions, 57 yards |
| Alabama | Passing | Mac Jones | 16–25, 327 yards, 3 TD |
| Alabama | Rushing | Najee Harris | 24 carries, 136 yards, 2 TD |
| Alabama | Receiving | Jerry Jeudy | 6 receptions, 204 yards, 1 TD |

== Rankings ==
Ranking movements Legend: ██ Increase in ranking ██ Decrease in ranking т = Tied with team above or below ( ) = First-place votes
| | Week | | | | | | | | | | | | | | | | |
| Poll | Pre | 1 | 2 | 3 | 4 | 5 | 6 | 7 | 8 | 9 | 10 | 11 | 12 | 13 | 14 | 15 | Final |
|---|---|---|---|---|---|---|---|---|---|---|---|---|---|---|---|---|---|
| AP | 2 (10) | 2 (8) | 2 (6) | 2 (5) | 2 (6) | 1 (29) | 1 (32) | 1 (30) | 1 (24) | 2 (21) | 2 (21) | 4 | 5 | 5 | 9 | 9-T | 8 |
| Coaches | 2 (6) | 2 (6) | 2 (3) | 2 (3) | 2 (2) | 1 (29) | 1 (42) | 1 (44) | 1 (44) | 1 (40) | 1 (37) | 4 | 5 | 5 | 9 | 9 | 8 |
| CFP | Not released | | | | | | | | | | 3 | 5 | 5 | 5 | 12 | 13 | Not released |

== Statistics ==
=== Team ===
Team Statistics
| | Alabama | Opponents |
|---|---|---|
| Points | | |
| First Downs | | |
| Rushing | | |
| Passing | | |
| Penalty | | |
| Rushing Yards | | |
| Rushing Attempts | | |
| Average Per Rush | | |
| Long | | |
| Rushing TDs | | |
| Passing yards | | |
| Comp–Att | | |
| Comp % | | |
| Average Per Game | | |
| Average per Attempt | | |
| Passing TDs | | |
| INTs | | |
| Rating | | |
| Touchdowns | | |
| Passing | | |
| Rushing | | |
| Defensive | | |
| Interceptions | | |
| Yards | | |
| Long | | |
| Total Offense | | |
| Total Plays | | |
| Average Per Yards/Game | | |
| Kick Returns: # – Yards | | |
| TDs | | |
| Long | | |
| Punts | | |
| Yards | | |
| Average | | |
| Punt Returns: # – Yards | | |
| TDs | | |
| Long | | |
| Fumbles – Fumbles Lost | | |
| Opposing TDs | | |
| Penalties – Yards | | |
| 3rd–Down Conversion % | | |
| 4th–Down Conversion % | | |
| Takeaways | | |
| Field Goals | | |
| Extra Point | | |
| Sacks | | |
| Sack Against | | |
| Yards | | |

=== Offense ===
Passing Statistics
| # | NAME | POS | RAT | CMP | ATT | YDS | CMP% | TD | INT |
|---|---|---|---|---|---|---|---|---|---|
| 13 | Tua Tagovailoa | QB | | 180 | 252 | 2840 | 33 | 3 | |
| 10 | Mac Jones | QB | | | | | | | |
| | Totals | | | | | | | | |

Rushing Statistics
| # | NAME | POS | CAR | YDS | LONG | TD | YPC |
|---|---|---|---|---|---|---|---|
| 22 | Najee Harris | RB | | | | | |
| | TOTALS | | | | | | |

Receiving Statistics
| # | NAME | POS | REC | YDS | LONG | TD | AVG |
|---|---|---|---|---|---|---|---|
| 4 | Jerry Jeudy | WR | | | | | |
| 17 | Jaylen Waddle | WR | | | | | |
| 11 | Henry Ruggs III | WR | | | | | |
| | TOTALS | | | | | | |

=== Defense ===
Defensive Statistics
| # | NAME | POS | SOLO | AST | TOT | TFL | SACKS | INT-YDS | PD | FR | FF |
|---|---|---|---|---|---|---|---|---|---|---|---|
| | | | 0 | 0 | 0 | 0 | 0 | 0-0 | 0 | 0 | 0 |
| | TOTAL | | 0 | 0 | 0 | 0 | 0 | 0-0 | 0 | 0 | 0 |
| | OPPONENTS | | 0 | 0 | 0 | 0 | 0 | 0 | 0 | 0 | 0 |

Key: POS: Position, SOLO: Solo Tackles, AST: Assisted Tackles, TOT: Total Tackles, TFL: Tackles-for-loss, SACK: Quarterback Sacks, INT: Interceptions, PD: Passes Defended, FF: Forced Fumbles, FR: Fumbles Recovered, BLK: Kicks or Punts Blocked, SAF: Safeties

Interceptions Statistics
| # | NAME | POS | INT | YDS | AVG | TD | LNG |
|---|---|---|---|---|---|---|---|
| | | | | 0 | 0.0 | 0 | 0 |
| | TOTALS | | | | | | |

=== Special teams ===
Kicking statistics
| # | NAME | XPM | XPA | XP% | FGM | FGA | FG% | 1–19 | 20–29 | 30–39 | 40–49 | 50+ | LNG | BLK | PTS |
|---|---|---|---|---|---|---|---|---|---|---|---|---|---|---|---|
| | | | | | | | | 0/0 | | | | 0/0 | | | |
| | TOTALS | | | | | | | | | | | 0/0 | | | |

Kick return statistics
| # | NAME | POS | RTNS | YDS | AVG | TD | LNG |
|---|---|---|---|---|---|---|---|
| 17 | Jaylen Waddle | WR/KR | | | | | |
| | TOTALS | | | | | | |

Punting statistics
| # | NAME | POS | PUNTS | YDS | AVG | LONG |
|---|---|---|---|---|---|---|
| | | P | | | | |
| | TOTALS | | | | | |

Punt return statistics
| # | NAME | POS | RTNS | YDS | AVG | TD | LONG |
|---|---|---|---|---|---|---|---|
| 17 | Jaylen Waddle | WR/PR | | | | | |
| | TOTALS | | | | | | |

== Scoring ==
=== Scores by quarter (non-conference opponents) ===
| | 1 | 2 | 3 | 4 | Total |
|---|---|---|---|---|---|
| All opponents | 0 | 10 | 7 | 3 | 20 |
| Alabama | 35 | 45 | 59 | 14 | 153 |

=== Scores by quarter (SEC opponents) ===
| | 1 | 2 | 3 | 4 | Total |
|---|---|---|---|---|---|
| SEC opponents | 34 | 9 | 20 | 39 | 102 |
| Alabama | 66 | 82 | 48 | 40 | 236 |

=== Scores by quarter (All opponents) ===
| | 1 | 2 | 3 | 4 | Total |
|---|---|---|---|---|---|
| All opponents | 34 | 19 | 27 | 42 | 122 |
| Alabama | 101 | 127 | 107 | 54 | 389 |

== Awards and honors ==
Weekly Awards
| Player | Position | Date | Ref. |
|---|---|---|---|
| Tua Tagovailoa (Co-SEC Offensive Player of the Week) | QB | September 2, 2019 | |
| D. J. Dale (Co-SEC Defensive Lineman Player of the Week) | DL | September 2, 2019 | |
| Tua Tagovailoa (2), (SEC Offensive Player of the Week) | QB | September 16, 2019 | |
| Landon Dickerson (SEC Offensive Lineman Player of the Week) | OL | September 16, 2019 | |
| DeVonta Smith (SEC Offensive Player of the Week) | WR | September 30, 2019 | |
| Jaylen Waddle (SEC Special Teams Player of the Week) | WR/PR | October 14, 2019 | |
| Alex Leatherwood (SEC Offensive Lineman Player of the Week) | OL | October 21, 2019 | |

Individual Awards
| Player | Position | Award | Ref. |
|---|---|---|---|
| Jaylen Waddle | WR/KR | SEC Special Teams Player of the Year | |

All-American
| Player | AP | AFCA | FWAA | TSN | WCFF | Designation |
|---|---|---|---|---|---|---|
| Jerry Jeudy | | 1 | | | | |
| Alex Leatherwood | | 1 | | | | |
| Jaylen Waddle | 2 | | 1 | 1 | 2 | |
| Jedrick Wills | 2 | 2 | | 2 | 2 | |
| Raekwon Davis | | 2 | | | | |
| Xavier McKinney | 3 | 2 | | 2 | 2 | |
| Trevon Diggs | 3 | 2 | | 2 | | |
| DeVonta Smith | 2 | | | 2 | | |
The NCAA recognizes a selection to all five of the AP, AFCA, FWAA, TSN and WCFF first teams for unanimous selections and three of five for consensus selections.

All-SEC
| Player | Position | Coaches | AP |
|---|---|---|---|
| Jedrick Wills | OL | 1 | 1 |
| Anfernee Jennings | LB | 1 | 1 |
| Xavier McKinney | DB | 1 | 1 |
| Alex Leatherwood | OL | 1 | 2 |
| Jerry Jeudy | WR | 1 | 2 |
| Trevon Diggs | DB | 2 | 1 |
| DeVonta Smith | WR | 2 | 1 |
| Jaylen Waddle | RS | 1 | |
| Tua Tagovailoa | QB | 2 | 2 |
| Landon Dickerson | C | 2 | 2 |
| Najee Harris | RB | 2 | 2 |
| Jaylen Waddle | AP | 2 | 2 |
| Raekwon Davis | DL | 2 | |
| Terrell Lewis | LB | 2 | |

All-SEC Academic
| Player | Position | Class | Major | Ref. |
|---|---|---|---|---|
HM = Honorable mention. Source:

== Postseason ==
=== Bowl game ===
Alabama was selected to face Michigan in the 2020 Citrus Bowl on New Year's Day. The last time Alabama faced Michigan was during the regular season in 2012 when the Tide beat Michigan 41–14. Alabama defeated Michigan 35–16 in the 2020 VRBO Citrus Bowl on January 1, 2020, to close out the season at 11–2 overall. For nine straight seasons, the Crimson Tide has won 11 or more games.

== 2020 NFL draft ==
The 2020 NFL draft was held virtually on April 23–25, 2020.

Crimson Tide who were picked in the 2020 NFL Draft:

| Round | Pick | Player | Position | NFL Club |
|---|---|---|---|---|
| 1 | 5 | Tua Tagovailoa | QB | Miami Dolphins |
| 1 | 10 | Jedrick Wills | OT | Cleveland Browns |
| 1 | 12 | Henry Ruggs | WR | Las Vegas Raiders |
| 1 | 15 | Jerry Jeudy | WR | Denver Broncos |
| 2 | 36 | Xavier McKinney | S | New York Giants |
| 2 | 51 | Trevon Diggs | CB | Dallas Cowboys |
| 2 | 56 | Raekwon Davis | DT | Miami Dolphins |
| 3 | 84 | Terrell Lewis | LB | Los Angeles Rams |
| 3 | 87 | Anfernee Jennings | OLB | New England Patriots |
| Undrafted | Free Agent | Shyheim Carter | S | New York Jets |
| Undrafted | Free Agent | Jared Mayden | S | San Francisco 49ers |

== Media affiliates ==
=== Radio ===
- WTID (FM) (Tide 102.9) – Nationwide (Dish Network, SiriusXM, TuneIn radio and iHeartRadio)

=== TV ===
- CBS Family - CBS 42 (CBS), CBS Sports Network
- ESPN/ABC Family - ABC 33/40 (ABC), ABC, ESPN, ESPN2, ESPNU, ESPN+, SEC Network)
- FOX Family - WBRC (FOX), FOX/FS1, FSN
