= Anfernee Jennings =

American football player (born 1997)

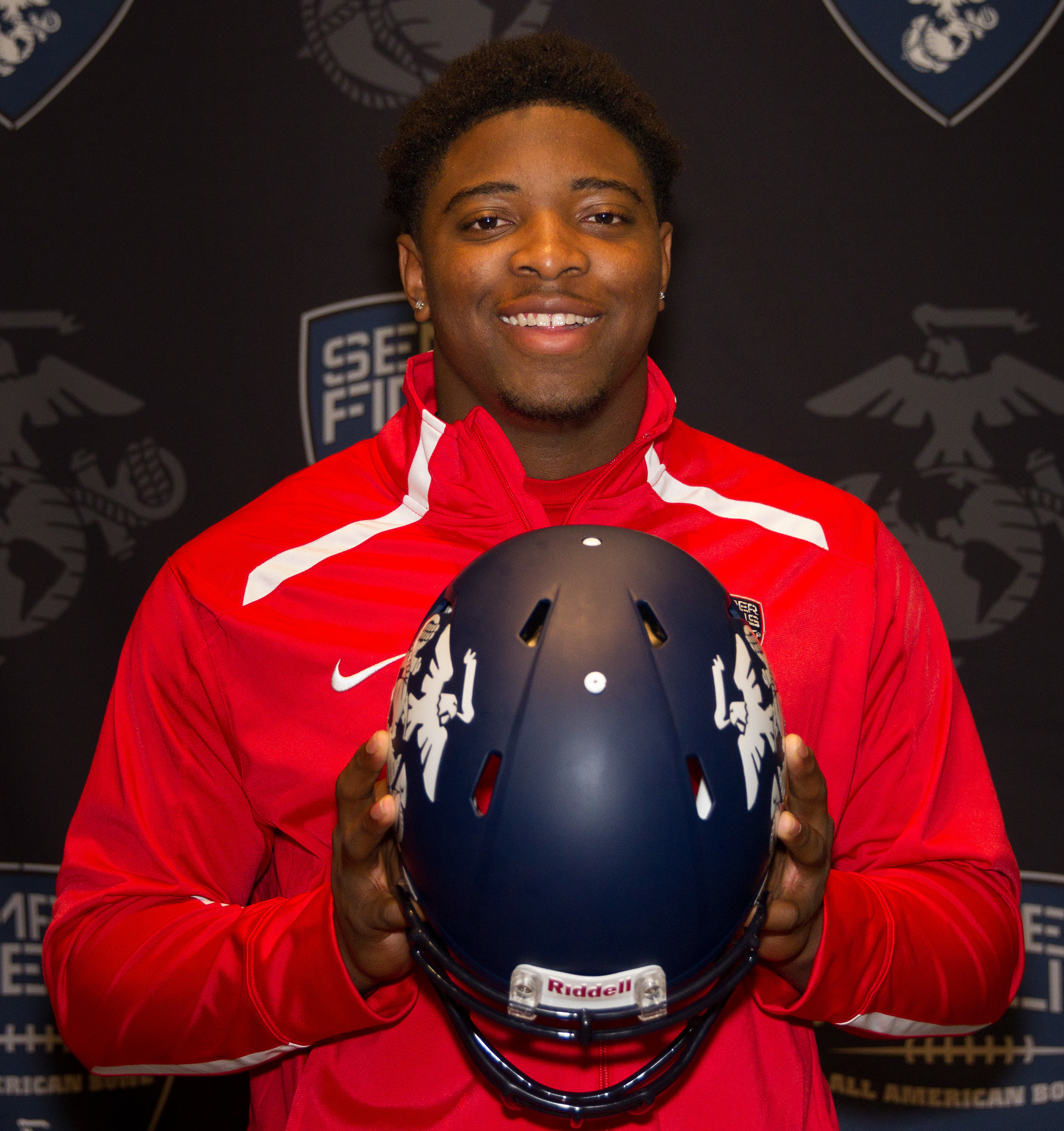
- Jennings in 2014

No. 33 – New Orleans Saints
- Position: Linebacker
- Roster status: Active

Personal information
- Born: May 1, 1997 (age 29); Dadeville, Alabama, U.S.
- Listed height: 6 ft 2 in (1.88 m)
- Listed weight: 255 lb (116 kg)

Career information
- High school: Dadeville
- College: Alabama (2015–2019)
- NFL draft: 2020: 3rd round, 87th overall pick

Career history
- New England Patriots (2020–2025); New Orleans Saints (2026–present)

Awards and highlights
- 2× CFP national champion (2015, 2017); First-team All-SEC (2019)

Career NFL statistics as of 2025
- Total tackles: 217
- Sacks: 7.5
- Forced fumbles: 2
- Fumble recoveries: 2
- Pass deflections: 3
- Stats at Pro Football Reference

Anfernee Jennings (born May 1, 1997) is an American professional football linebacker for the New Orleans Saints of the National Football League (NFL). He played college football for the Alabama Crimson Tide and was selected in the third round of the 2020 NFL draft by the New England Patriots.

== Early life ==
Jennings grew up in Dadeville, Alabama, and attended Dadeville High School, where he played defensive end and tight end for the Tigers. He made 171 tackles with seven sacks in his junior season and was named honorable mention Super All-State by AL.com. As a senior, Jennings was named first-team 4A All-State and the 4A Lineman of the Year after posting 170 tackles with 88 solo stops, 14 sacks, nine pass breakups and two forced fumbles. Rated a four-star recruit, Jennings committed to play college football at Alabama over offers from Arkansas, Arizona State, Georgia, Mississippi State and Nebraska.

== College career ==
Jennings redshirted his true freshman season as he moved from defensive end to the outside linebacker position. He played as a key reserve as a redshirt freshman, finishing the year with 19 tackles (two for loss) and three quarterback hurries. Jennings became a starter during redshirt sophomore season and made 41 tackles, six for a loss, with one sack. Jennings suffered what was initially diagnosed to be a PCL injury in the final minutes of the 2018 Sugar Bowl against Clemson, causing him to miss the 2018 College Football Playoff National Championship Game. The injury was re-evaluated and Jennings was found to have also damaged an artery and developed a blood clot in his leg.

Jennings returned from his injury in time to begin his redshirt junior season. He finished the year with 51 tackles, including 14 for loss, 6.5 sacks, with an interception, a team-high 11 passes defended and two fumble recoveries (one of which was returned for his first career touchdown). Jennings entered his redshirt senior season on the Chuck Bednarik Award and Butkus Award watchlists and was named pre-season All-SEC and a second-team pre-season All-American by the Sporting News. Jennings had 83 tackles, 12.5 tackles for loss, 8.0 sacks, five pass breakups, one forced fumble and an interception and was named first-team All-SEC in his final season. Jennings finished his collegiate career with 194 tackles, 34.5 tackles for loss, 15.5 sacks, three forced fumbles, two interceptions and 20 passes defended in 54 games (38 starts).

== Professional career ==
Pre-draft measurables
| Height | Weight | Arm length | Hand span | Wingspan |
|---|---|---|---|---|
| 6 ft 2 1/8 in (1.88 m) | 256 lb (116 kg) | 32 7/8 in (0.84 m) | 9 1/8 in (0.23 m) | 6 ft 7 1/2 in (2.02 m) |
All values from NFL Combine

=== New England Patriots ===
In the 2020 NFL draft, Jennings was drafted by the New England Patriots in the third round with the 87th overall pick. He made his NFL debut in the season opener on September 13, 2020, against the Miami Dolphins, playing nine snaps on defense in a 21–11 win. Jennings made his first career start on October 18, recording three tackles in an 18–12 loss to the Denver Broncos. He had 20 total tackles (ten solo) as a rookie in 14 games.

On August 31, 2021, Jennings was placed on injured reserve, ending his season.

Jennings entered the 2022 season as a backup linebacker. He played in 16 games with three starts, recording 27 tackles, 1.5 sacks, two passes defensed, and a forced fumble. In the 2023 season, he had 1.5 sacks, 66 total tackles (49 solo), and one fumble recovery.

On March 15, 2024, Jennings signed a three-year, $12 million contract extension with the Patriots. He finished the 2024 season with 2.5 sacks, 78 total tackles (43 solo), and one pass defended. He finished the 2025 season with two sacks, 26 tackles (15 solo), and one fumble recovery. Jennings had a sack in both the Wild Card Round and the Divisional Round victories over the Los Angeles Chargers and Houston Texans. He had six total tackles in Super Bowl LX, a 29–13 loss to the Seattle Seahawks.

On March 11, 2026, Jennings was released by the Patriots.

=== New Orleans Saints ===
On April 28, 2026, Jennings signed a one-year contract with the New Orleans Saints.

== Personal life ==
Jennings's younger brother, Shawndarius "Shawn" Jennings, also played college football and originally played at Alabama with Anfernee before transferring to South Alabama.
