= Miller Forristall =

American football player (born 1998)

No. 86
- Position: Tight end

Personal information
- Born: March 11, 1998 (age 28); Cartersville, Georgia, U.S.
- Listed height: 6 ft 5 in (1.96 m)
- Listed weight: 243 lb (110 kg)

Career information
- High school: Cartersville
- College: Alabama (2016–2020)
- NFL draft: 2021: undrafted

Career history
- Tennessee Titans (2021)*; Cleveland Browns (2021–2022); New Orleans Saints (2023)*; Cleveland Browns (2023)*; Los Angeles Rams (2023–2024)*
- * Offseason or practice squad member only

Awards and highlights
- 2× CFP national champion (2017, 2020)
- Stats at Pro Football Reference

Miller Forristall (born March 11, 1998) is an American former professional football tight end. He played college football at Alabama, and played in the National Football League (NFL) for the Cleveland Browns.

== College career ==
Forristall was a member of the Alabama Crimson Tide for five seasons. He played in all 15 of Alabama's games as a freshman and caught five passes for 73 yards. Forristall used a medical redshirt after he suffered a torn ACL in the third game of his sophomore season against Colorado State. He played in all 15 of the Crimson Tide's games the following season, but did not catch a pass. Forristall became a starter at tight end as a redshirt junior but missed four games after breaking the larynx and hyoid bone in his throat in a win over Arkansas. He finished the season with 15 receptions for 167 yards and four touchdowns. Forristall caught 23 passes for 253 yards and one touchdown during his redshirt senior season as the Crimson Tide won the 2021 College Football Playoff National Championship.

== Professional career ==
Pre-draft measurables
Height	Weight	Arm length	Hand span	40-yard dash	10-yard split	20-yard split	20-yard shuttle	Three-cone drill	Vertical jump	Broad jump	Bench press
6 ft 4 3/4 in (1.95 m)	239 lb (108 kg)	33 in (0.84 m)	10 1/4 in (0.26 m)	4.79 s	1.71 s	2.77 s	4.45 s	7.03 s	35.0 in (0.89 m)	9 ft 10 in (3.00 m)	20 reps
All values from Pro Day

=== Tennessee Titans ===
Forristall was signed by the Tennessee Titans as an undrafted free agent on May 1, 2021. He was waived by the Titans during final roster cuts on August 31, but was re-signed to the team's practice squad the following day. Forristall was waived by the Titans on September 3.

=== Cleveland Browns ===
Forristall signed by the Cleveland Browns to their practice squad on September 20, 2021. He was elevated to the active roster on November 7, for the team's Week 9 game against the Cincinnati Bengals. He was signed to the active roster on December 7. He was waived on December 24. Forristall was re-signed to the Browns' practice squad on December 28.

The Browns signed Forristall to a reserve/futures contract on January 10, 2022. He was waived by the Browns on August 30. The Browns re-signed Forristall to their practice squad the next day. He was promoted to the active roster on October 1. Forristall was waived by Cleveland on October 10 and re-signed to the practice squad.

=== New Orleans Saints ===
On January 26, 2023, Forristall signed a reserve/future contract with the New Orleans Saints. Forristall was waived by the Saints on July 25.

=== Cleveland Browns (second stint) ===
On August 4, 2023, Forristall signed with the Cleveland Browns. On August 27, Forristall was released by the Browns.

=== Los Angeles Rams ===
On September 12, 2023, Forristall signed with the practice squad of the Los Angeles Rams. He was released on December 5, then re-signed a week later.

On January 16, 2024, Forristall signed a reserve/future contract with the Rams. He was waived by Los Angeles on August 27, and subsequently re-signed to the team's practice squad. Forristall was released by the Rams on November 15.

On September 23, 2025, Forristall announced his retirement from professional football.
