= Jared Mayden =

American football player (born 1998)

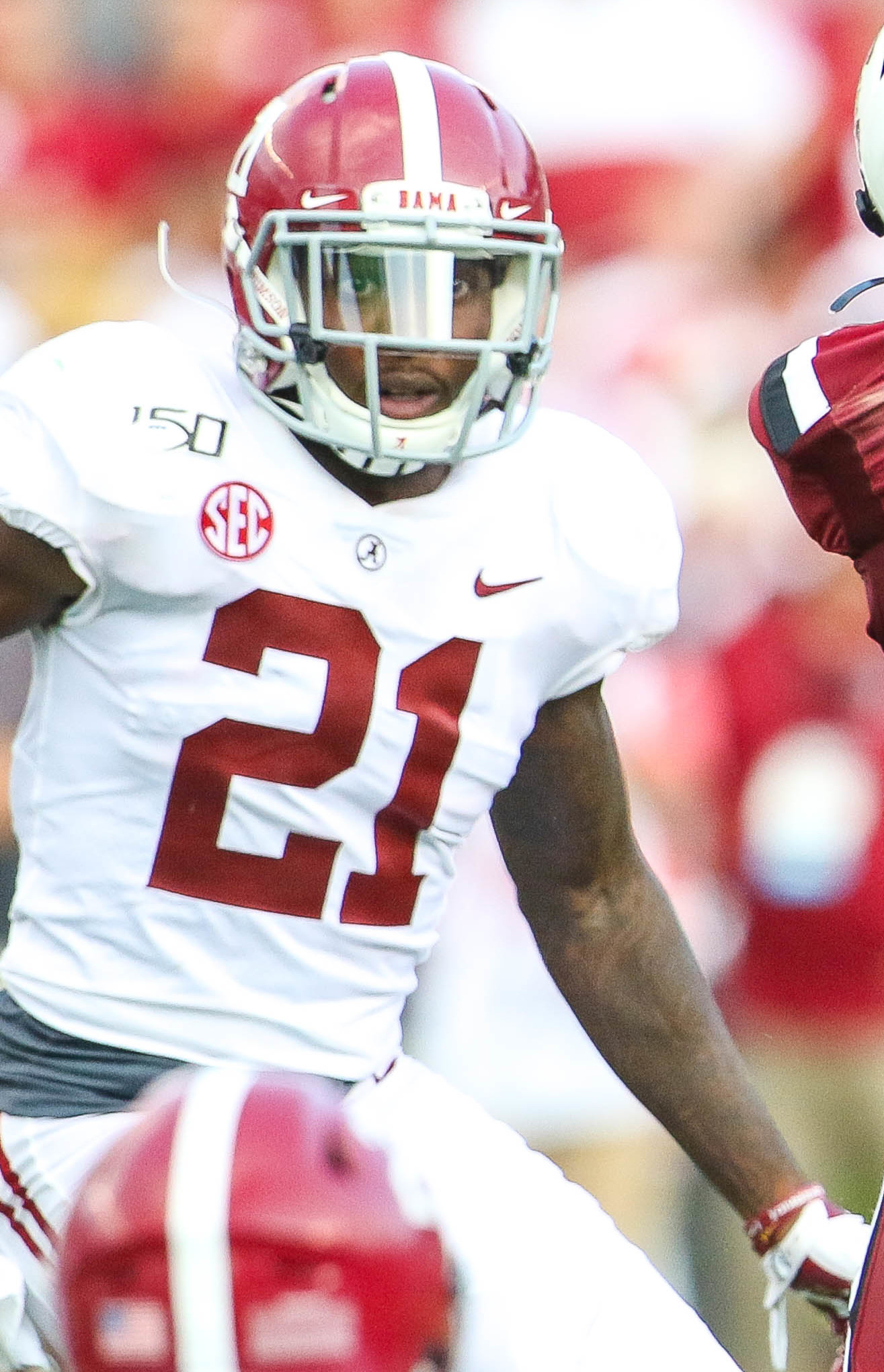
- Jared Mayden with Alabama in 2019

Profile
- Position: Safety

Personal information
- Born: June 24, 1998 (age 28); Dallas, Texas, U.S.
- Listed height: 6 ft 0 in (1.83 m)
- Listed weight: 205 lb (93 kg)

Career information
- High school: Sachse (Sachse, Texas)
- College: Alabama
- NFL draft: 2020: undrafted

Career history
- San Francisco 49ers (2020–2021); Philadelphia Eagles (2021–2022); Buffalo Bills (2022)*; New York Jets (2022)*; Buffalo Bills (2022); Arlington Renegades (2024)*
- * Offseason or practice squad member only

Awards and highlights
- CFP national champion (2017)

Career NFL statistics
- Total tackles: 7
- Stats at Pro Football Reference

Jared Mayden (born June 24, 1998) is an American football safety. He played college football at Alabama.

== College career ==
Mayden started at safety as a senior at Alabama. He totalled four interceptions and allowed 17 receptions on 30 targets for 152 yards during the season. Mayden also racked up 59 tackles, three tackles for a loss and three pass breakups, and was praised for his versatility in playing several defensive positions. Mayden participated in the Senior Bowl.

== Professional career ==
=== San Francisco 49ers ===
Mayden was signed by the San Francisco 49ers as an undrafted free agent on April 28, 2020. He was waived on September 5, 2020, and signed to the practice squad the next day. He was elevated to the active roster on October 24 and November 14 for the team's weeks 7 and 10 games against the New England Patriots and New Orleans Saints, and reverted to the practice squad after each game. He was placed on the practice squad/injured list on November 17, 2020. He signed a reserve/future contract on January 6, 2021.

On August 31, 2021, Mayden was waived by the 49ers and re-signed to the practice squad the next day. He was released on October 18.

=== Philadelphia Eagles ===
On October 26, 2021, Mayden was signed to the Philadelphia Eagles practice squad. He signed a reserve/future contract with the Eagles on January 18, 2022. He was waived/injured on August 16 and placed on injured reserve. He was released on September 20.

=== Buffalo Bills ===
On October 10, 2022, Mayden was signed to the Buffalo Bills practice squad. On November 3, he was cut from the practice squad.

=== New York Jets ===
On November 5, 2022, Mayden was signed to the New York Jets practice squad.

=== Buffalo Bills (second stint) ===
On January 4, 2023, Mayden was signed by the Buffalo Bills off the Jets practice squad. He was waived on August 27, 2023.

=== Arlington Renegades ===
On December 18, 2023, Mayden was signed by the Arlington Renegades of the XFL. He was waived on March 21, 2024.
