= Darrian Dalcourt =

American football player (born 2000)

Profile
- Position: Guard

Personal information
- Born: September 17, 2000 (age 26); Baltimore, Maryland, U.S.
- Listed height: 6 ft 3 in (1.91 m)
- Listed weight: 309 lb (140 kg)

Career information
- High school: Saint Frances Academy (Baltimore)
- College: Alabama (2019–2023)
- NFL draft: 2024: undrafted

Career history
- Baltimore Ravens (2024–2025)*; Washington Commanders (2025)*; Carolina Panthers (2025)*; Cleveland Browns (2025)*; New England Patriots (2026)*
- * Offseason or practice squad member only

Awards and highlights
- CFP national champion (2020)
- Stats at Pro Football Reference

Darrian Dalcourt (born September 17, 2000) is an American professional football guard. He played college football for the Alabama Crimson Tide. Dalcourt signed with the Baltimore Ravens as an undrafted free agent in 2024.

== Early life ==
Dalcourt attended high school at Saint Frances Academy. Coming out of high school, Dalcourt was rated as a four star recruit, where he committed to play college football for the Alabama Crimson Tide.

== College career ==
In Dalcourt's first two seasons in 2019 and 2020, he combined to play in 14 games for Alabama, with no starts. During the 2021 and 2022 seasons, Dalcourt combined to play in 18 games, while also making 16 starts at center for the Crimson Tide. Heading into Dalcourt's final collegiate season he made the switch from center to right guard. In his last season, Dalcourt played in eight games with five starts for the Crimson Tide.

== Professional career ==
Pre-draft measurables
| Height | Weight | Arm length | Hand span | Wingspan | 40-yard dash | 10-yard split | 20-yard split | 20-yard shuttle | Three-cone drill | Vertical jump | Broad jump |
|---|---|---|---|---|---|---|---|---|---|---|---|
| 6 ft 2 3/4 in (1.90 m) | 309 lb (140 kg) | 31 5/8 in (0.80 m) | 9 5/8 in (0.24 m) | 6 ft 6 1/4 in (1.99 m) | 5.38 s | 1.80 s | 3.13 s | 4.83 s | 8.02 s | 24.0 in (0.61 m) | 8 ft 0 in (2.44 m) |
All values from Pro Day

=== Baltimore Ravens ===
After not being selected in the 2024 NFL draft, Dalcourt decided to sign with the Baltimore Ravens as an undrafted free agent. He was waived on August 27, 2024, and re-signed to the practice squad. Dalcourt signed a reserve/future contract with Baltimore on January 21, 2025. He was waived by the Ravens on August 27.

=== Washington Commanders ===
On September 2, 2025, Dalcourt was signed to the Washington Commanders' practice squad. He was released by the Commanders with an injury settlement on September 17.

=== Carolina Panthers ===
On October 7, 2025, Dalcourt signed with the Carolina Panthers' practice squad.

=== Cleveland Browns ===
On December 9, 2025, Dalcourt signed with the Cleveland Browns' practice squad.

=== New England Patriots ===
On August 15, 2026, Dalcourt signed with the New England Patriots. On August 30, Dalcourt was released by the Patriots as a part of final roster cuts.
