= Jedrick Wills =

American football player (born 1999)

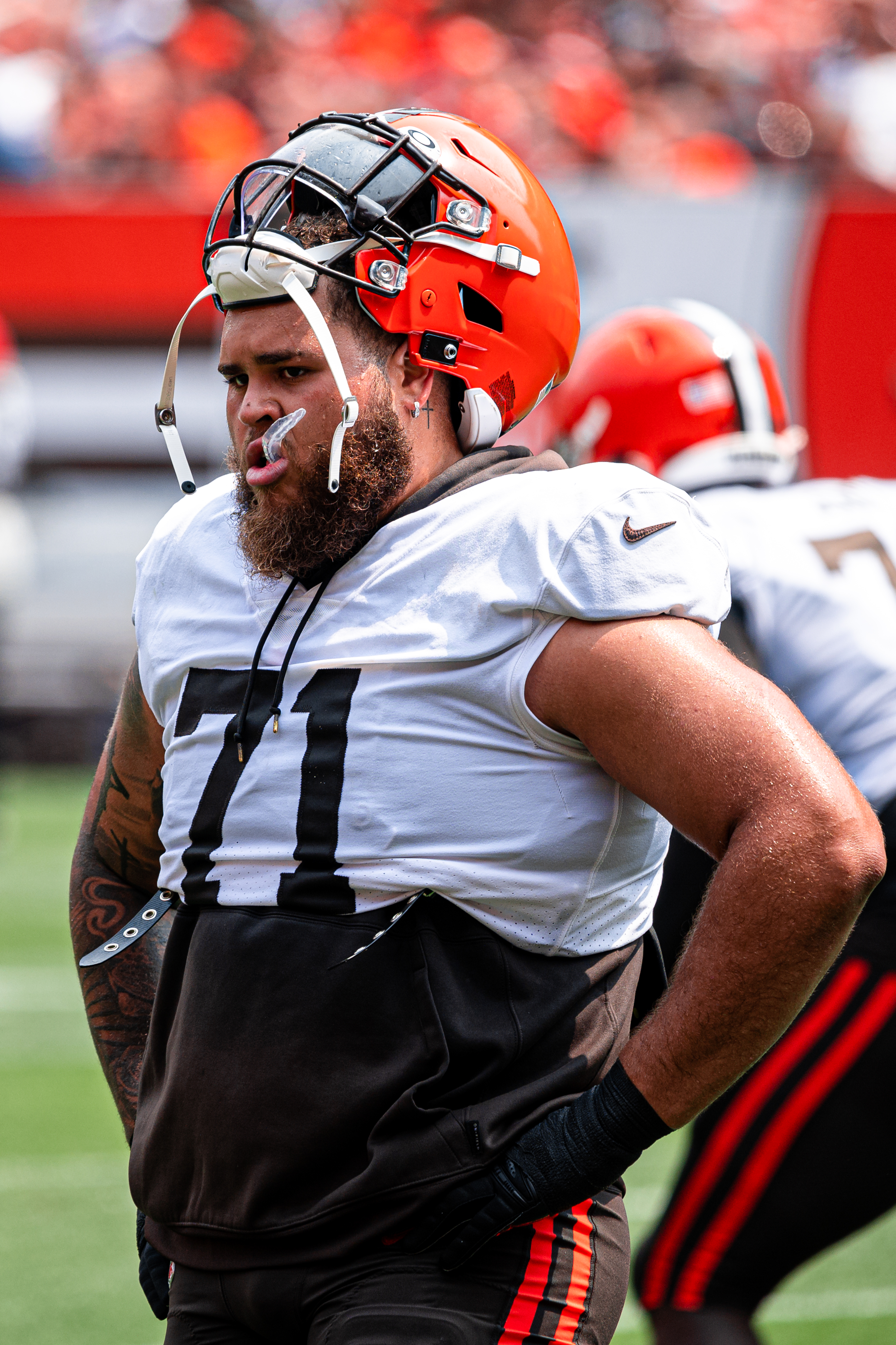
- Wills with the Cleveland Browns in 2021

No. 79 – Arizona Cardinals
- Position: Offensive tackle
- Roster status: Active

Personal information
- Born: May 17, 1999 (age 27); Lexington, Kentucky, U.S.
- Listed height: 6 ft 4 in (1.93 m)
- Listed weight: 307 lb (139 kg)

Career information
- High school: Lafayette (Lexington)
- College: Alabama (2017–2019)
- NFL draft: 2020: 1st round, 10th overall pick

Career history
- Cleveland Browns (2020–2024); Chicago Bears (2026)*; Buffalo Bills (2026)*; Arizona Cardinals (2026–present)
- * Offseason or practice squad member only

Awards and highlights
- PFWA All-Rookie Team (2020); CFP national champion (2017); Second-team All-American (2019); First-team All-SEC (2019)

Career NFL statistics as of Week 10, 2026
- Games played: 64
- Games started: 57
- Stats at Pro Football Reference

Jedrick Wills Jr. (born May 17, 1999) is an American professional football offensive tackle for the Arizona Cardinals of the National Football League (NFL). He played college football for the Alabama Crimson Tide and was selected by the Cleveland Browns in the first round of the 2020 NFL draft.

== Early life ==
Wills grew up in Lexington, Kentucky and attended Lafayette High School. He was named first-team All-State by the Associated Press as a junior and senior and was invited to play in the Under Armour All-America Game. Rated the top college prospect in the state of Kentucky, Wills committed to play college football for the Alabama Crimson Tide over offers from Kentucky, Michigan, Tennessee and Notre Dame.

== College career ==
Wills appeared in 11 games as a true freshman with one start, which came when the Crimson Tide opened their game against Ole Miss with a six lineman formation. Wills was named the starter at right tackle going into his sophomore season. He started all 15 of the Crimson Tide's games and was named the Southeastern Conference (SEC) Offensive Lineman of the Week for week 7 against Missouri.

Wills was named a first-team preseason All-American by Athlon Sports and to the second-team by the Associated Press, The Sporting News, Sports Illustrated, USA Today entering his junior season. Wills was named a first-team midseason All-American by the Associated Press. He was named first-team All-SEC and was a consensus second-team All-America selection at the end of the season after starting all of the Crimson Tides' games and missing only seven total blocking assignments in 771 total snaps played. In January 2020, Wills announced that he would be forgoing his senior season to enter the 2020 NFL draft.

== Professional career ==
Pre-draft measurables
Height	Weight	Arm length	Hand span	Wingspan	40-yard dash	10-yard split	20-yard split	20-yard shuttle	Vertical jump	Broad jump
6 ft 4 1/4 in (1.94 m)	312 lb (142 kg)	34 1/4 in (0.87 m)	10 in (0.25 m)	6 ft 11 1/2 in (2.12 m)	5.05 s	1.81 s	2.94 s	4.84 s	34.5 in (0.88 m)	9 ft 5 in (2.87 m)
All values from NFL Combine

=== Cleveland Browns ===
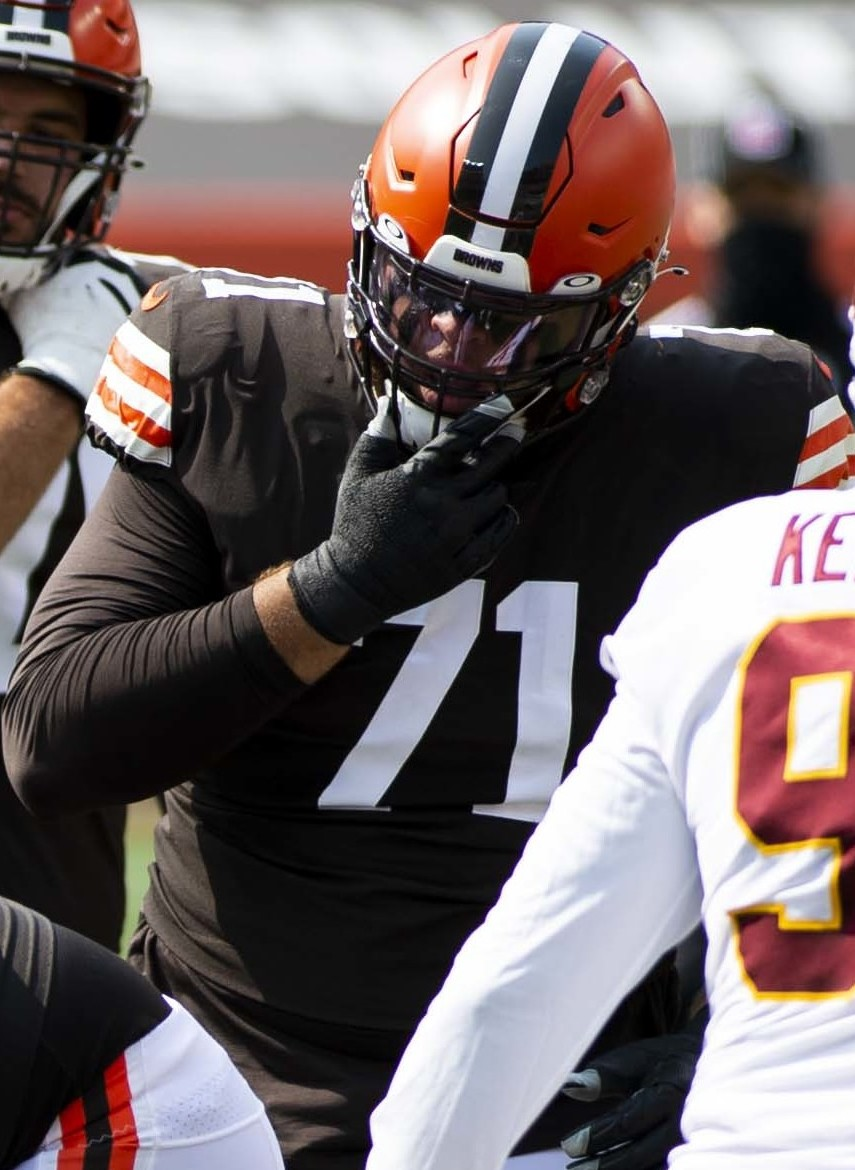
Jedrick Wills (2020)

Wills was selected by the Cleveland Browns in the first round with the 10th overall pick of the 2020 NFL draft. Wills made his debut in the season opener against the Baltimore Ravens before leaving the game due to a minor shin injury. In Week 10, Wills won the Pepsi NFL Rookie of the Week award for helping the Browns offense gain 231 rushing yards and a touchdown over the Houston Texans, becoming the first offensive lineman to win the award since 2013. He was placed on the reserve/COVID-19 list by the Browns on December 24, 2020, and activated two days later. Wills was named to the PFWA All-Rookie Team.

On May 2, 2023, the Browns picked up the fifth-year option of Wills' contract. He suffered an MCL injury in Week 9 and was placed on injured reserve on November 7. Wills continued to struggle with injury in 2024, playing in five games.

==== Rehab ====
Wills became a free agent following the 2024 season, and did not sign with a team in 2025. Wills later stated that his season-long rehabilitation was to allow an alignment issue with his knee ligaments to heal fully.

=== Chicago Bears ===
On March 12, 2026, Wills signed a one-year contract with the Chicago Bears. On August 30, he was released by Chicago during final roster cuts.

=== Buffalo Bills ===
On August 31, 2026, Wills signed with the Buffalo Bills' practice squad.

=== Arizona Cardinals ===
On October 6, 2026, Wills was signed by the Arizona Cardinals off the Bills practice squad.
