= DeMarcco Hellams =

American football player (born 2000)

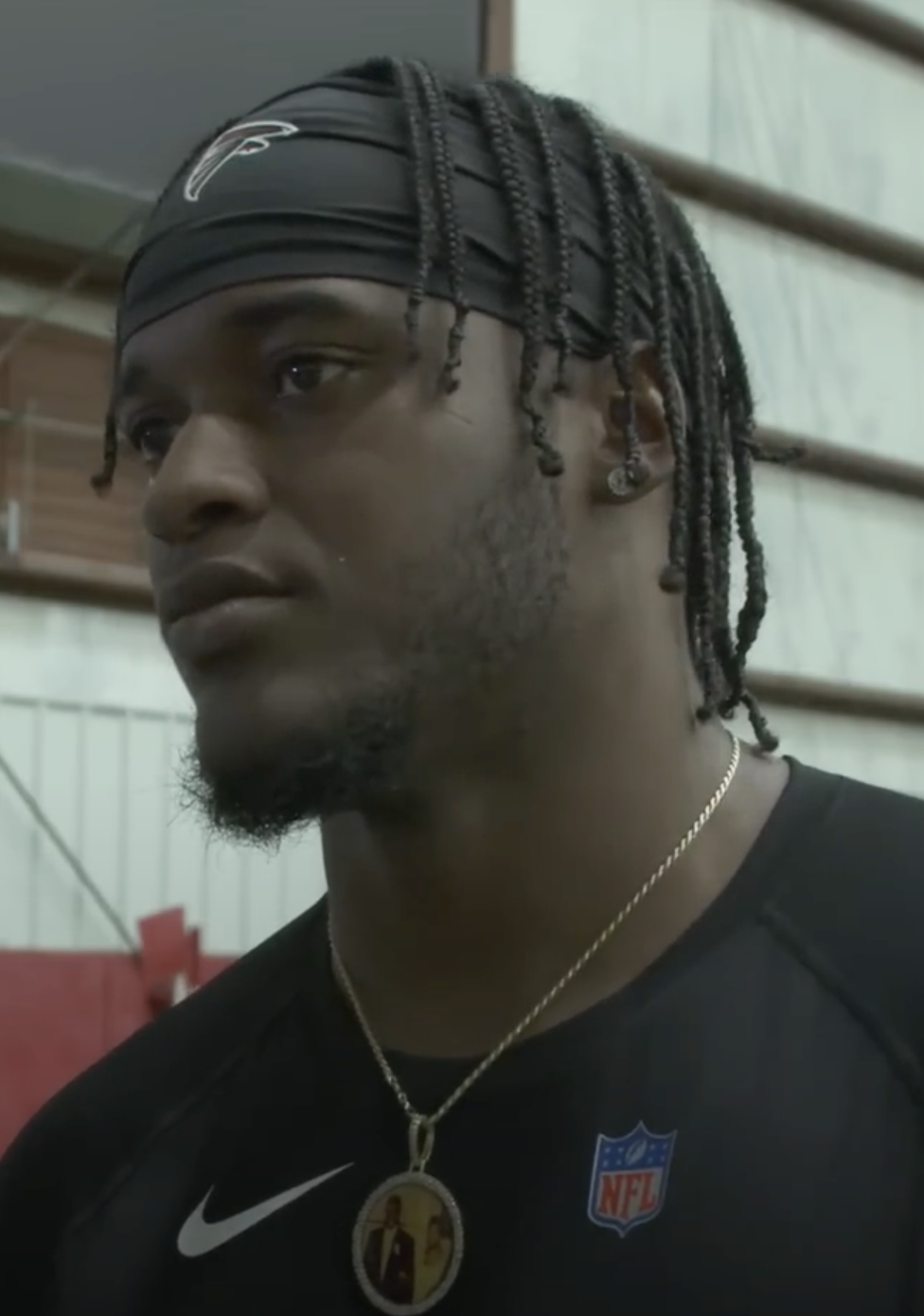
- Hellams in 2023

No. 23 – Atlanta Falcons
- Position: Safety
- Roster status: Active

Personal information
- Born: June 5, 2000 (age 26); Washington, D.C., U.S.
- Listed height: 6 ft 1 in (1.85 m)
- Listed weight: 203 lb (92 kg)

Career information
- High school: DeMatha Catholic (Hyattsville, Maryland)
- College: Alabama (2019–2022)
- NFL draft: 2023: 7th round, 224th overall pick

Career history
- Atlanta Falcons (2023–present)

Career NFL statistics as of Week 5, 2026
- Total tackles: 54
- Fumble recoveries: 1
- Pass deflections: 1
- Stats at Pro Football Reference

DeMarcco Hellams (born June 5, 2000) is an American professional football safety for the Atlanta Falcons of the National Football League (NFL). He played college football for the Alabama Crimson Tide.

== Early life ==
Hellams attended DeMatha Catholic High School in Hyattsville, Maryland. He played defensive back and wide receiver in high school. As a senior, he was the Washington Post Metro Offensive Player of the Year after catching 78 passes for 1,469 yards and 21 touchdowns on offense and 12 interceptions on defense. Hellams committed to the University of Alabama to play college football.

== College career ==
Hellams played in 13 games as a true freshman in 2019, recording four tackles and 0.5 sacks. In 13 games his sophomore year in 2020, he had 56 tackles and one sack. As a first-year starter in 2021, Hellams had 87 tackles and three interceptions. He returned to Alabama for his senior year in 2022, where he finished sixth in the SEC with 108 tackles, leading the Crimson Tide.

== Professional career ==
Pre-draft measurables
Height	Weight	Arm length	Hand span	Wingspan	40-yard dash	10-yard split	20-yard split	20-yard shuttle	Three-cone drill	Vertical jump	Broad jump
6 ft 0 5/8 in (1.84 m)	203 lb (92 kg)	31 in (0.79 m)	9 in (0.23 m)	6 ft 2 7/8 in (1.90 m)	4.57 s	1.57 s	2.63 s	4.57 s	7.29 s	31.0 in (0.79 m)	10 ft 1 in (3.07 m)
All values from NFL Combine/Pro Day

Hellams was selected by the Atlanta Falcons in the seventh round with the 224th overall pick in the 2023 NFL draft.

Hellams was placed on injured reserve on August 27, 2024, to begin the regular season, where he ultimately remainder for the entirety of the year.

Hellams made 11 appearances for Atlanta in 2025, primarily on special teams, in which he posted 10 tackles and a fumble recovery. On December 6, 2025, Hellams was placed on injured reserve due to a hamstring injury.

== NFL career statistics ==
Legend
**Bold**	Career high

=== Regular season ===
Year	Team	Games		Tackles					Interceptions						Fumbles					
Year	Team	GP	GS	Cmb	Solo	Ast	TFL	Sck	PD	Int	Yds	Avg	Lng	TD	FF	FR	Yds	Avg	Lng	TD
2023	ATL	**15**	**4**	**40**	**25**	**15**	**1**	0.0	0	0	0	0.0	0	0	0	0	0	0.0	0	0
2024	ATL	Did not play due to injury																		
2025	ATL	11	0	10	4	6	0	0.0	0	0	0	0.0	0	0	0	0	0	0.0	0	0
2026	ATL	5	0	4	2	2	**1**	0.0	**1**	0	0	0.0	0	0	0	0	0	0.0	0	0
Career		31	4	54	31	23	2	0.0	1	0	0	0.0	0	0	0	0	0	0.0	0	0

== Personal life ==
Hellams' older brother, Delante Jr., played college football as a wide receiver for Stony Brook from 2017 to 2022.
