= Terrell Lewis =

American football player (born 1998)

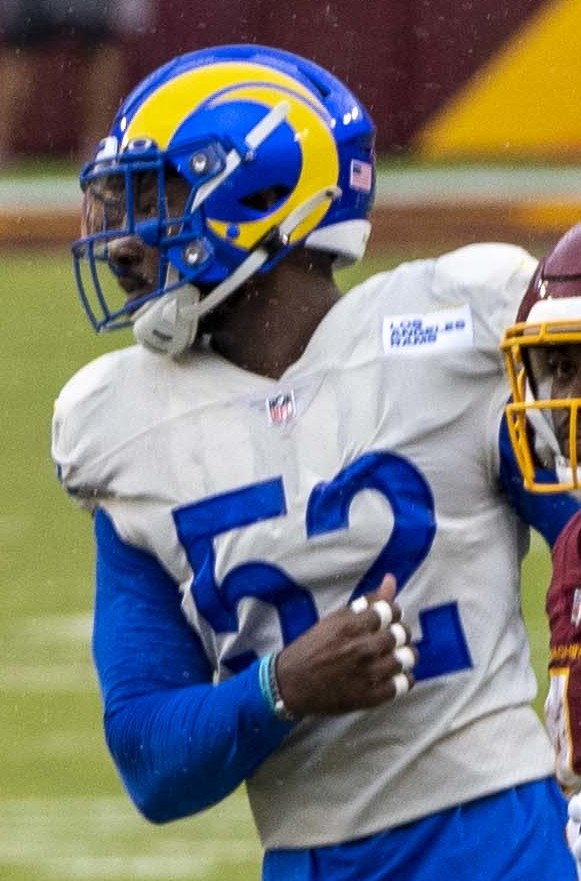
- Lewis with the Los Angeles Rams in 2020

Profile
- Position: Linebacker

Personal information
- Born: August 25, 1998 (age 28); Washington, D.C., U.S.
- Listed height: 6 ft 5 in (1.96 m)
- Listed weight: 262 lb (119 kg)

Career information
- High school: St. John's College (Washington, D.C.)
- College: Alabama (2016–2019)
- NFL draft: 2020: 3rd round, 84th overall pick

Career history
- Los Angeles Rams (2020–2022); Chicago Bears (2022); New Orleans Saints (2023)*; Philadelphia Eagles (2024)*
- * Offseason or practice squad member only

Awards and highlights
- Super Bowl champion (LVI); CFP national champion (2017); Second-team All-SEC (2019)

Career NFL statistics
- Total tackles: 40
- Sacks: 6
- Forced fumbles: 1
- Pass deflections: 3
- Interceptions: 1
- Stats at Pro Football Reference

Terrell Lewis (né Hall; born August 25, 1998) is an American professional football linebacker. He played college football for the Alabama Crimson Tide.

== Early life ==
Born Terrell Hall, Lewis grew up in Washington, D.C., and attended St. John's College High School. As a senior, Lewis recorded 42 tackles, 21 tackles for a loss, and nine sacks he was named the Football Player of the Year for Washington, D.C., by USA Today and Gatorade. He was also invited to play in the 2016 Under Armour All-America Game. Rated a five star recruit by Rivals.com and four stars by ESPN, Scout and 247Sports, as well as a top-ten weak side defensive end by all four, Lewis initially committed to play college football at Ohio State during his junior year. He de-committed from Ohio State in the summer going into his senior year, ultimately committing to play at Alabama after considering offers from Maryland, Florida State and Mississippi.

== College career ==
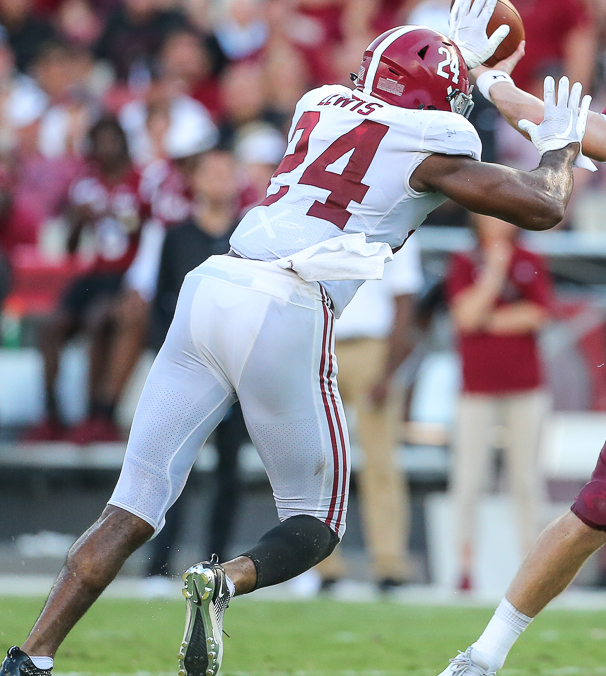
Lewis playing for Alabama in 2019

As a freshman Lewis played in 11 games for the Crimson Tide, making 11 tackles with one sack. He tore a ligament in the first game of his sophomore season against Florida State, causing him to miss the next ten games. He returned for the final game of the regular season against Auburn and played in the postseason, making his first career start in the 2018 College Football Playoff National Championship. He finished the season with 16 total tackles and a sack. Lewis tore his ACL in summer training camp going into his junior season and was forced to use a medical redshirt.

Lewis entered his redshirt junior season as a starting outside linebacker for Alabama and was named to the Butkus Award watchlist. He finished the season with 31 tackles, 11.5 tackles for loss, 6.0 sacks, 16 quarterback hurries, two pass breakups and one fumble recovery and was named second team All-Southeastern Conference. Lewis opted not to play in the Citrus Bowl and decided to enter the 2020 NFL draft, forgoing his final year of NCAA eligibility. Lewis finished his collegiate career with 58 tackles (14.5 for loss), eight sacks, three passes defended and a forced fumble in 26 games played.

== Professional career ==
Pre-draft measurables
Height	Weight	Arm length	Hand span	Vertical jump	Broad jump
6 ft 5 1/4 in (1.96 m)	262 lb (119 kg)	33 7/8 in (0.86 m)	9 7/8 in (0.25 m)	37.0 in (0.94 m)	10 ft 4 in (3.15 m)
All values from NFL Combine

=== Los Angeles Rams ===
Lewis was selected by the Los Angeles Rams in the third round with the 84th overall pick in the 2020 NFL draft. He was placed on the reserve/COVID-19 list by the team on July 31, 2020. He was activated on August 14, 2020. He was placed on the reserve/non-football injury (NFI) list on September 9, 2020. He was designated to return from the NFI list on October 1, and began practicing with the team again. He was activated on October 10 and made his NFL debut on October 11, 2020, in a 30–10 win over the Washington Football Team.

In Week 10 against the Seattle Seahawks, Lewis recorded his first two career sacks on Russell Wilson during the 23–16 win.

Lewis won Super Bowl LVI when the Rams defeated the Cincinnati Bengals.

On December 15, 2022, Lewis was waived by the Rams.

=== Chicago Bears ===
On December 20, 2022, Lewis was signed to the practice squad of the Chicago Bears. On January 4, 2023, the Bears signed him to the active roster.

On August 30, 2023, Lewis was waived by the Bears.

=== New Orleans Saints ===
On September 13, 2023, Lewis was signed to the New Orleans Saints practice squad. On October 3, 2023, the Saints released Lewis.

=== Philadelphia Eagles ===
On January 18, 2024, Lewis signed a reserve/future contract with the Philadelphia Eagles. He was waived on August 27.

== Personal life ==
Lewis changed his last name from Hall to Lewis going into his sophomore year of college.
