= Raekwon Davis =

American football player (born 1997)

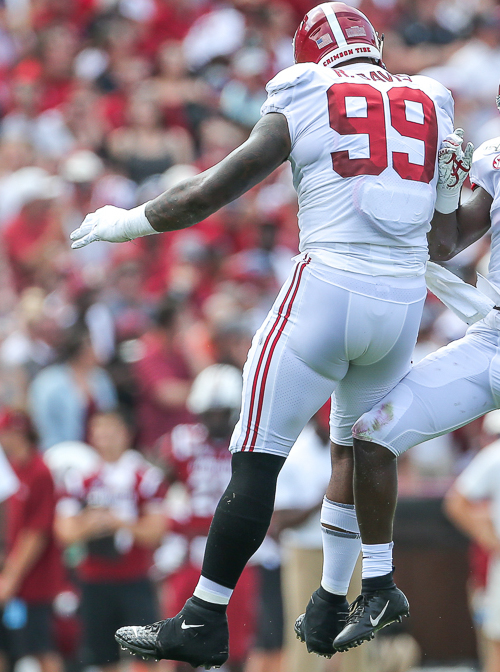
- Davis with the Alabama Crimson Tide in 2019

Profile
- Position: Defensive tackle

Personal information
- Born: August 21, 1997 (age 29); Meridian, Mississippi, U.S.
- Listed height: 6 ft 7 in (2.01 m)
- Listed weight: 325 lb (147 kg)

Career information
- High school: Meridian
- College: Alabama (2016–2019)
- NFL draft: 2020: 2nd round, 56th overall pick

Career history
- Miami Dolphins (2020–2023); Indianapolis Colts (2024)

Awards and highlights
- PFWA All-Rookie Team (2020); CFP national champion (2017); First-team All-SEC (2017); 2× Second-team All-SEC (2018, 2019)

Career NFL statistics
- Tackles: 144
- Sacks: 2.0
- Pass deflections: 1
- Stats at Pro Football Reference

Raekwon Jay Davis (Pronounced: RAY-kwon) (born June 10, 1997) is an American professional football defensive tackle.

Davis was selected in 2020 by the Miami Dolphins, for whom he played out his 4-year rookie contract. He previously played college football for the Alabama Crimson Tide, winning a national title in January 2018.

== Early life ==
Raekwon Davis was born August 21, 1997, in Meridian, Mississippi.

He attended Meridian High School where he played football as a defensive lineman. He was not a high school superstar, logging just 10 tackles in 2013, his sophomore year. Despite the relative lack of production and his lack of finished technique, the raw Davis made an attractive prospect for college football owing to his oversized frame, standing 6'7" tall and tipping the scales at nearly 310 pounds even before graduation.

Major football programs around the region were intrigued. The first to offer the three-star prospect a scholarship was the Alabama Crimson Tide, who issued a formal offer in June 2014. Mississippi State and the University of South Carolina were quick to follow, as did Ole Miss—who sought to convert Davis to offensive tackle.

At the end of July, Davis made his decision, committing to the program that had offered him first, the University of Alabama.

Davis' junior season proved more successful. The big defensive tackle finished with 31 tackles and 6 sacks in helping to lead the Wildcats to a 7–5 record in 2014. Four of the team's 5 losses were by just 4 points or less, leading to a 2015 preseason No. 3 Mississippi state ranking by the Jackson Clarion-Ledger.

== College career ==
Davis saw action in four games as true freshman at the University of Alabama in 2016. His output was tangential to the team's success, adding just four tackles, one sack, and one forced fumble for the year.

The Crimson Tide would finish the season with a record of 14–0 before losing to the Clemson Tigers 35–31 in the College Football Playoff National Championship held in January 2017.

Late in the summer of his 2017 sophomore year, Davis was shot in the right leg and hospitalized with a minor injury. According to the Tuscaloosa News, Davis had been standing outside a bar in the early morning hours on Sunday, August 27, when he was hit in the leg by a stray bullet, requiring hospital attention. Due to Davis' lack of cooperation with law enforcement officials, police investigation of the incident was quickly cancelled.

Less than a week Later on September 2, Davis played in the Alabama opening game against the Florida State Seminoles, and recorded a sack. The 2017 would be his best statistical year at Alabama, with Davis racking up 8.5 sacks and 10 tackles for loss in 13 games played for the Crimson Tide.

The Crimson Tide would once again advance to the College Football Playoff National Championship in January 2018, this time emerging triumphant in overtime over the Georgia Bulldogs, 26–23. Davis snagged a crucial third quarter interception off a tipped pass from Georgia quarterback Jake Fromm in the comeback victory.

During his junior season, Davis received notoriety for punching Missouri Tigers lineman Kevin Pendleton during a game. Although multiple blows were landed, all captured on video, and a penalty flag was thrown, Davis was not ejected from the game. He issued an apology to Pendleton later in the night after conclusion of the game.

Again Alabama mowed down the competition, finishing the season with a record of 14–0 and advancing to the College Football Playoff National Championship in January 2019. This time hard defeat would come, with Alabama demolished by Clemson, 44–16. Despite the bitterness of the loss, there would be a personal accolade for Davis, as he was named a second team All-American at defensive tackle.

Despite speculation that he would declare for the 2019 NFL draft, Davis announced that he would return to Alabama for his senior season. During this 2019 senior season, Davis appeared in 12 games, logging 18 solo tackles, 29 assists, and splitting one quarterback sack with a teammate.

== Professional career ==
Pre-draft measurables
Height	Weight	Arm length	Hand span	40-yard dash	10-yard split	20-yard split	20-yard shuttle	Three-cone drill	Vertical jump	Broad jump	Bench press
6 ft 6 1/8 in (1.98 m)	311 lb (141 kg)	33 7/8 in (0.86 m)	11 in (0.28 m)	5.12 s	1.78 s	2.99 s	4.86 s	7.95 s	28.0 in (0.71 m)	9 ft 3 in (2.82 m)	24 reps
All values from NFL Combine

=== Miami Dolphins ===
Davis was selected in the second round of the 2020 NFL draft by the Miami Dolphins, who made him the 56th pick overall. He was placed on the reserve/COVID-19 list by the team on August 6, 2020, and activated two days later.

Davis played all 16 games for the Dolphins during his rookie season of 2020, finishing the year with 40 tackles. He was named to the PFWA All-Rookie Team.

On September 14, 2021, Davis was placed on injured reserve after suffering a knee injury in Week 1. He was activated on October 9, 2021.

During his four years playing with the Dolphins under his rookie contract, Davis saw action in 63 of a possible 66 games, starting 48 times. He saw a great deal of game action, averaging more than 500 snaps per season, but most of his work was done at the line of scrimmage, with just 2 sacks, 10 quarterback hits, and 5 tackles for loss made over that duration.

=== Indianapolis Colts ===
On March 15, 2024, the free agent Davis signed a two-year contract with the Indianapolis Colts. The deal is set to pay Davis $14 million over its duration, with $7 million of that figure guaranteed.

The Colts were expected to use Davis as a rotational reserve with starting defensive tackles Grover Stewart and DeForest Buckner in 2024, a role which Davis was quick to embrace. "Playing with Buckner and Grove, I feel like it’s a great fit for me," Davis said at the time of his signing. "Since coming out of 'Bama, I’ve been playing the same technique, two-gapping [single-handedly taking on two blockers], and to experience a different technique, being with those two guys, is going to be great."

Under defensive coordinator Gus Bradley and defensive line coach Charlie Partridge, the Colts have typically played an "attack front" — moving interior defensive linemen upfield rather than sitting at the line of scrimmage to eat blocks in order to allow teammates on the second level to move up to make plays on the ball-carrier. In signing Davis, the Colts effectively gambled on his ability to make a transition to the new scheme.

On March 6, 2025, Davis was released by the Colts.

== NFL career statistics ==
Legend
**Bold**	Career high

=== Regular season ===
Year	Team	Games		Tackles					Interceptions						Fumbles			
Year	Team	GP	GS	Cmb	Solo	Ast	Sck	TFL	PD	Int	Yds	Avg	Lng	TD	FF	FR	Yds	TD
2020	MIA	16	12	**48**	**19**	**21**	0.0	1	0	—	—	—	—	—	0	0	0	0
2021	MIA	14	14	28	12	16	0.5	1	0	—	—	—	—	—	0	0	0	0
2022	MIA	16	15	33	13	20	**1.0**	1	0	—	—	—	—	—	0	0	0	0
2023	MIA	17	7	28	15	13	0.5	**2**	0	—	—	—	—	—	0	0	0	0
2024	IND	17	0	15	7	8	0.0	1	**1**	—	—	—	—	—	0	0	0	0
Career		80	48	144	66	78	2.0	6	1	0	0	0.0	0	0	0	0	0	0

=== Postseason ===
Year	Team	Games		Tackles					Interceptions						Fumbles			
Year	Team	GP	GS	Cmb	Solo	Ast	Sck	TFL	PD	Int	Yds	Avg	Lng	TD	FF	FR	Yds	TD
2022	MIA	1	1	1	0	**1**	0	0	0	—	—	—	—	—	0	0	0	0
2023	MIA	1	0	**2**	**1**	**1**	0	0	0	—	—	—	—	—	0	0	0	0
Career		2	1	3	1	2	0	0	0	0	0	0.0	0	0	0	0	0	0
