= 2016 Alabama Crimson Tide football team =

American college football season

2016 Alabama Crimson Tide football

National champion (Colley) SEC champion SEC Western Division champion Peach Bowl champion

SEC Championship Game, W 54–16 vs. Florida

Peach Bowl (CFP Semifinal), W 24–7 vs. Washington CFP National Championship, L 31–35 vs. Clemson
- Conference: Southeastern Conference
- Western Division

Ranking
- Coaches: No. 2
- AP: No. 2
- Record: 14–1 (8–0 SEC)
- Head coach: Nick Saban (10th season)
- Offensive coordinator: Lane Kiffin (3rd season; regular season and bowl game); Steve Sarkisian (national championship game)
- Offensive scheme: Multiple spread
- Defensive coordinator: Jeremy Pruitt (1st season)
- Base defense: 3–4
- Captains: Jonathan Allen; Reuben Foster; Eddie Jackson; Cam Robinson
- Home stadium: Bryant–Denny Stadium

Uniform
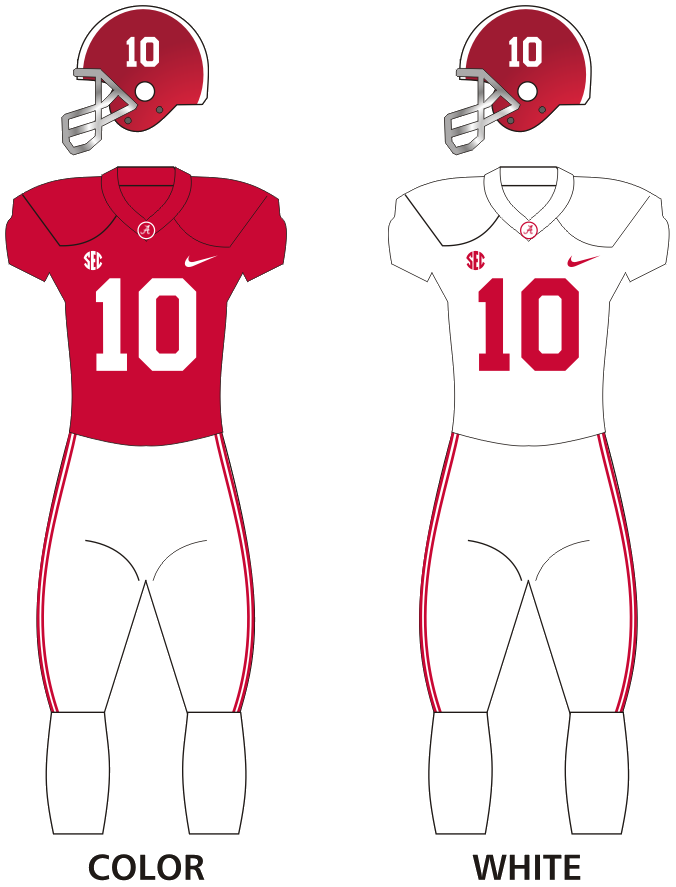

2016 Southeastern Conference football standings
	Conf.			Overall
Team	W		L	W		L
Eastern Division
No. 14 Florida x	6	–	2	9	–	4
No. 22 Tennessee	4	–	4	9	–	4
Georgia	4	–	4	8	–	5
Kentucky	4	–	4	7	–	6
South Carolina	3	–	5	6	–	7
Vanderbilt	3	–	5	6	–	7
Missouri*	2	–	6	4	–	8
Western Division
No. 2 Alabama x$^	8	–	0	14	–	1
No. 24 Auburn	5	–	3	8	–	5
No. 13 LSU	5	–	3	8	–	4
Texas A&M	4	–	4	8	–	5
Arkansas	3	–	5	7	–	6
Mississippi State	3	–	5	6	–	7
Ole Miss*	2	–	6	5	–	7
Championship: Alabama 54, Florida 16
^ – College Football Playoff participant; $ – Conference champion; x – Division champion/co-champions; * Ole Miss and Missouri vacated all wins due to NCAA violations.; Rankings from AP Poll

The 2016 Alabama Crimson Tide football team represented the University of Alabama in the 2016 NCAA Division I FBS football season. This season marked the Crimson Tide's 122nd overall season, 83rd as a member of the Southeastern Conference (SEC) and its 25th within the SEC Western Division. They played their home games at Bryant–Denny Stadium in Tuscaloosa, Alabama and were led by tenth year head coach Nick Saban. They finished the season 14–1, were SEC champions and advanced to the College Football Playoff National Championship game, for the second consecutive year, where they were defeated by Clemson.

== Offseason ==
=== Departures ===
Notable departures from the 2015 squad included

Name	Number	Pos.	Height	Weight	Year	Hometown	Notes
Derrick Henry	#2	RB	6'3	245	Junior	Yulee, FL	Declared for the 2016 NFL draft
A'Shawn Robinson	#86	DE	6'4	312	Junior	Fort Worth, TX	Declared for the 2016 NFL draft
Jake Coker	#14	QB	6'5	232	Senior	Mobile, AL	Undrafted free agent
Denzel Devall	#30	LB	6'2	252	Senior	Bastrop, LA	Undrafted free agent
Kenyan Drake	#17	RB	6'1	210	Senior	Powder Springs, GA	Declared for the 2016 NFL draft
Dominick Jackson	#76	OL	6'6	315	Senior	Cupertino, CA	Undrafted free agent
Cyrus Jones	#5	CB	5'10	196	Senior	Baltimore, MD	Declared for the 2016 NFL draft
Ryan Kelly	#70	OL	6'5	297	Senior	West Chester, OH	Declared for the 2016 NFL draft
Dillon Lee	#25	LB	6'4	242	Senior	Buford, GA	Undrafted free agent
Richard Mullaney	#16	WR	6'3	208	Senior	Thousand Oaks, CA	Undrafted free agent
Michael Nysewander	#46	TE	6'1	237	Senior	Hoover, AL	Undrafted free agent
D.J. Pettway	#57	LB	6'2	270	Senior	Pensacola, FL	Undrafted free agent
Reggie Ragland	#19	LB	6'2	252	Senior	Madison, AL	Declared for the 2016 NFL draft
Jarran Reed	#90	DL	6'4	313	Senior	Goldsboro, NC	Declared for the 2016 NFL draft
Geno Matias-Smith	#24	S	6'0	196	Senior	Atlanta, GA	Undrafted free agent
Alec Morris	#11	QB	6'3	233	Junior	Allen, TX	Transferred to North Texas

== Preseason ==
=== 2016 recruiting class ===
Prior to National Signing Day on February 3, 2016, eight players enrolled for the spring semester in order to participate in spring practice and included six former high school seniors and two junior college transfers. On National Signing Day, Alabama signed 18 additional players out of high school that completed the 2016 recruiting class. The class was highlighted by 19 players from the "ESPN 300". Alabama signed the No. 1 recruiting class according to Rivals.com, Scout.com and 247Sports.com and No. 2 at ESPN recruiting class.

College recruiting (2016)
Name	Hometown	School	Height	Weight	40^{‡}	Commit date
T.J. Simmons #110 WR	Pinson, AL	Clay-Chalkville High School	6 ft 2 in (1.88 m)	189 lb (86 kg)	4.67	Feb 19, 2015
T.J. Simmons #110 WR	Recruit ratings: Scout: Rivals: 247Sports: ESPN:					
Miller Forristall #11 TE	Cartersville, GA	Cartersville High School	6 ft 6 in (1.98 m)	210 lb (95 kg)	4.68	Jun 13, 2015
Miller Forristall #11 TE	Recruit ratings: Scout: Rivals: 247Sports: ESPN:					
Shawn Jennings #44 S	Dadeville, AL	Dadeville High School	6 ft 1 in (1.85 m)	215 lb (98 kg)	4.58	Jul 29, 2015
Shawn Jennings #44 S	Recruit ratings: Scout: Rivals: 247Sports: ESPN:					
Jamar King #8 DE (JC)	Detroit, MI	Mendocino College	6 ft 4 in (1.93 m)	270 lb (120 kg)	–	Feb 3, 2016
Jamar King #8 DE (JC)	Recruit ratings: Scout: Rivals: 247Sports: ESPN:					
Josh Jacobs #36 RB	Tulsa, OK	McLean High School	5 ft 10 in (1.78 m)	200 lb (91 kg)	–	Feb 3, 2016
Josh Jacobs #36 RB	Recruit ratings: Scout: Rivals: 247Sports: ESPN:					
Jalen Hurts #13 QB	Channelview, TX	Channelview High School	6 ft 2 in (1.88 m)	208 lb (94 kg)	4.85	Jun 6, 2015
Jalen Hurts #13 QB	Recruit ratings: Scout: Rivals: 247Sports: ESPN:					
Irv Smith Jr. #6 TE	New Orleans, LA	Brother Martin High School	6 ft 4 in (1.93 m)	230 lb (100 kg)	4.79	Feb 3, 2016
Irv Smith Jr. #6 TE	Recruit ratings: Scout: Rivals: 247Sports: ESPN:					
Aaron Robinson #18 ATH	Deerfield Beach, FL	Deerfield Beach High School	6 ft 1 in (1.85 m)	175 lb (79 kg)	4.55	Feb 3, 2016
Aaron Robinson #18 ATH	Recruit ratings: Scout: Rivals: 247Sports: ESPN:					
Christian Bell; DE	Birmingham, AL	Hoover High School	6 ft 4 in (1.93 m)	225 lb (102 kg)	–	Apr 24, 2014
Christian Bell; DE	Recruit ratings: Scout: Rivals: 247Sports: ESPN:					
Quinnen Williams #31 DE	Birmingham, AL	Wenonah High School	6 ft 4 in (1.93 m)	265 lb (120 kg)	5.24	Jun 30, 2015
Quinnen Williams #31 DE	Recruit ratings: Scout: Rivals: 247Sports: ESPN:					
Jared Mayden #17 CB	Sachse, TX	Sachse High School	6 ft 1 in (1.85 m)	198 lb (90 kg)	4.36	Feb 3, 2016
Jared Mayden #17 CB	Recruit ratings: Scout: Rivals: 247Sports: ESPN:					
Raekwon Davis #18 DT	Meridian, MS	Meridian High School	6 ft 8 in (2.03 m)	318 lb (144 kg)	5.49	Jan 18, 2016
Raekwon Davis #18 DT	Recruit ratings: Scout: Rivals: 247Sports: ESPN:					
Scott Lashley #15 OT	West Point, MS	West Point High School	6 ft 6 in (1.98 m)	305 lb (138 kg)	5.27	Feb 2, 2016
Scott Lashley #15 OT	Recruit ratings: Scout: Rivals: 247Sports: ESPN:					
Kendell Jones #15 DT	Killeen, TX	Shoemaker High School	6 ft 5 in (1.96 m)	361 lb (164 kg)	5.65	May 23, 2015
Kendell Jones #15 DT	Recruit ratings: Scout: Rivals: 247Sports: ESPN:					
Deonte Brown #7 OG	Decatur, AL	Austin High School	6 ft 3 in (1.91 m)	340 lb (150 kg)	5.24	Apr 30, 2016
Deonte Brown #7 OG	Recruit ratings: Scout: Rivals: 247Sports: ESPN:					
Trevon Diggs #6 ATH	Gaithersburg, MD	The Avalon School	6 ft 2 in (1.88 m)	182 lb (83 kg)	4.45	Nov 7, 2015
Trevon Diggs #6 ATH	Recruit ratings: Scout: Rivals: 247Sports: ESPN:					
Charles Baldwin #1 OT (JC)	Windsor, CT	ASA College	6 ft 5 in (1.96 m)	300 lb (140 kg)	–	Jun 6, 2015
Charles Baldwin #1 OT (JC)	Recruit ratings: Scout: Rivals: 247Sports: ESPN:					
Chris Owens #3 OG	Arlington, TX	Lamar High School	6 ft 3 in (1.91 m)	312 lb (142 kg)	5.45	Apr 22, 2015
Chris Owens #3 OG	Recruit ratings: Scout: Rivals: 247Sports: ESPN:					
Terrell Hall #6 DE	Washington, DC	Saint John's College High School	6 ft 6 in (1.98 m)	254 lb (115 kg)	4.88	Feb 3, 2016
Terrell Hall #6 DE	Recruit ratings: Scout: Rivals: 247Sports: ESPN:					
Shyheim Carter #6 CB	Kentwood, LA	Kentwood High School	6 ft 0 in (1.83 m)	177 lb (80 kg)	4.38	Feb 3, 2016
Shyheim Carter #6 CB	Recruit ratings: Scout: Rivals: 247Sports: ESPN:					
Nigel Knott #5 CB	Madison, MS	Germantown High School	5 ft 11 in (1.80 m)	174 lb (79 kg)	4.51	Feb 1, 2016
Nigel Knott #5 CB	Recruit ratings: Scout: Rivals: 247Sports: ESPN:					
Mack Wilson #5 OLB	Montgomery, AL	Carver High School	6 ft 2 in (1.88 m)	236 lb (107 kg)	4.58	Feb 3, 2016
Mack Wilson #5 OLB	Recruit ratings: Scout: Rivals: 247Sports: ESPN:					
B.J. Emmons #1 RB	Morganton, NC	Freedom High School	5 ft 11 in (1.80 m)	220 lb (100 kg)	4.52	Jul 20, 2015
B.J. Emmons #1 RB	Recruit ratings: Scout: Rivals: 247Sports: ESPN:					
Jonah Williams #3 OT	Folsom, CA	Folsom High School	6 ft 5 in (1.96 m)	280 lb (130 kg)	5.20	Apr 4, 2015
Jonah Williams #3 OT	Recruit ratings: Scout: Rivals: 247Sports: ESPN:					
Ben Davis #1 ILB	Gordo, AL	Gordo High School	6 ft 4 in (1.93 m)	237 lb (108 kg)	4.77	Feb 3, 2016
Ben Davis #1 ILB	Recruit ratings: Scout: Rivals: 247Sports: ESPN:					
Overall recruit ranking: Scout: 1 Rivals: 1 247Sports: 1 ESPN: 7
Note: In many cases, Scout, Rivals, 247Sports, On3, and ESPN may conflict in their listings of height and weight.; In these cases, the average was taken. ESPN grades are on a 100-point scale.; Sources: "2016 Alabama Football Commitment List". Rivals.; "2016 Alabama Commits". Scout.; "2016 Players Commitments – Alabama". ESPN.; "Scout.com Team Recruiting Rankings". Scout.; "2016 Team Ranking". Rivals.com.; "2016 Alabama Crimson Tide football team". 247Sports.

=== Returning starters ===
Alabama had seven returning players on offense, five on defense and five on special teams that started games in 2015.

==== Offense ====
Player	Class	Position
Ross Pierschbacher	Sophomore	Offensive Line
Cam Robinson	Junior	Offensive Line
Alphonse Taylor	Senior	Offensive Line
O. J. Howard	Senior	Tight End
Robert Foster	Junior	Wide Receiver
Calvin Ridley	Sophomore	Wide Receiver
ArDarius Stewart	Junior	Wide Receiver

==== Defense ====
Player	Class	Position
Minkah Fitzpatrick	Sophomore	Cornerback
Marlon Humphrey	Sophomore	Cornerback
Jonathan Allen	Senior	Defensive End
Ryan Anderson	Senior	Linebacker
Reuben Foster	Senior	Linebacker
Tim Williams	Senior	Linebacker
Eddie Jackson	Senior	Safety

==== Special teams ====
Player	Class	Position
Adam Griffith	Senior	Kicker
J. K. Scott	Junior	Punter
Cole Mazza	Senior	Long Snapper

=== Spring practice ===
Spring practice began March 11, 2016. The annual A-Day game was held on April 16, 2016.

2016 A-Day Spring Game

Team	1	2	3	4	Total
• White	0	0	0	7	7
Crimson	0	0	0	3	3

- Location: Tuscaloosa, Alabama
- Game start: 2 pm
- Game attendance: 76,212
- Television network: ESPN

== Schedule ==
Alabama faced all six Western Division opponents: Arkansas, Auburn, LSU, Mississippi State, Ole Miss, and Texas A&M. They also faced two Eastern Division opponents: official SEC rival Tennessee, and Kentucky.

The team played four non-conference games, three home games against the Western Kentucky of C-USA, Kent State of the MAC, Chattanooga of the FCS' Southern, and traveled to Arlington, TX to play USC of the Pac-12 for the Advocare Classic at AT&T Stadium, a non—conference game at a neutral site.

Date	Time	Opponent	Rank	Site	TV	Result	Attendance
September 3	7:00 p.m.	vs. No. 20 USC*	No. 1	AT&T Stadium; Arlington, TX (Advocare Classic)	ABC	W 52–6	81,359
September 10	2:30 p.m.	Western Kentucky*	No. 1	Bryant–Denny Stadium; Tuscaloosa, AL	ESPN2	W 38–10	101,821
September 17	2:30 p.m.	at No. 19 Ole Miss	No. 1	Vaught–Hemingway Stadium; Oxford, MS (rivalry, SEC Nation)	CBS	W 48–43	66,176
September 24	11:00 a.m.	Kent State*	No. 1	Bryant–Denny Stadium; Tuscaloosa, AL	SECN	W 48–0	101,821
October 1	6:00 p.m.	Kentucky^{†}	No. 1	Bryant–Denny Stadium; Tuscaloosa, AL	ESPN	W 34–6	101,821
October 8	6:00 p.m.	at No. 16 Arkansas	No. 1	Donald W. Reynolds Razorback Stadium; Fayetteville, AR	ESPN	W 49–30	75,459
October 15	2:30 p.m.	at No. 9 Tennessee	No. 1	Neyland Stadium; Knoxville, TN (Third Saturday in October, SEC Nation)	CBS	W 49–10	102,455
October 22	2:30 p.m.	No. 6 Texas A&M	No. 1	Bryant–Denny Stadium; Tuscaloosa, AL (College GameDay)	CBS	W 33–14	101,821
November 5	7:00 p.m.	at No. 13 LSU	No. 1	Tiger Stadium; Baton Rouge, LA (rivalry, College GameDay)	CBS	W 10–0	102,321
November 12	11:00 a.m.	Mississippi State	No. 1	Bryant–Denny Stadium; Tuscaloosa, AL (rivalry)	ESPN	W 51–3	101,821
November 19	6:00 p.m.	No. 12 (FCS) Chattanooga*	No. 1	Bryant–Denny Stadium; Tuscaloosa, AL	ESPN2	W 31–3	101,821
November 26	2:30 p.m.	No. 13 Auburn	No. 1	Bryant–Denny Stadium; Tuscaloosa, AL (Iron Bowl, SEC Nation)	CBS	W 30–12	101,821
December 3	3:00 p.m.	vs. No. 15 Florida	No. 1	Georgia Dome; Atlanta, GA (SEC Championship Game, rivalry, SEC Nation)	CBS	W 54–16	74,632
December 31	2:00 p.m.	vs. No. 4 Washington*	No. 1	Georgia Dome; Atlanta, GA (Peach Bowl–CFP Semifinal, SEC Nation)	ESPN	W 24–7	75,996
January 9, 2017	7:00 p.m.	vs. No. 2 Clemson*	No. 1	Raymond James Stadium; Tampa, FL (CFP National Championship, rivalry, College GameDay, SEC Nation)	ESPN	L 31–35	74,512
*Non-conference game; ^{†}Homecoming; Rankings from AP Poll and CFP Rankings after November 1 released prior to game; All times are in Central time

== Game summaries ==
=== USC ===
USC Trojans vs. Alabama Crimson Tide – Game summary

Quarter	1	2	3	4	Total
#20 USC	3	0	3	0	6
#1 Alabama	0	17	21	14	52

at AT&T Stadium • Arlington, TX

- Date: September 3, 2016
- Game time: 7:14 p.m.
- Game weather: Indoors (retractable roof closed)
- Game attendance: 81,359
- Referee: Reggie Smith
- TV announcers (ABC):
  Chris Fowler (play-by-play)
  Kirk Herbstreit (color)
  Samantha Ponder (sideline)
- Sources:
  First Quarter
  - (Q1, 12:33) USC – #39 Matt Boermeester 47 yard Field Goal – USC 3–0
  Second Quarter
  - (Q2, 7:54) ALA – #13 ArDarius Stewart 39 yard pass from #2 Jalen Hurts (#99 Adam Griffith kick) – ALA 7–3
  - (Q2, 3:30) ALA – #99 Adam Griffith 29 yard Field Goal – ALA 10–3
  - (Q2, 2:48) ALA – #26 Marlon Humphrey 18 yard interception run (#99 Adam Griffith kick) – ALA 17–3
  Third Quarter
  - (Q3, 13:53) ALA – #13 Ardarius Stewart 71 yard pass from #2 Jalen Hurts (#99 Adam Griffith kick) – ALA 24–3
  - (Q3, 11:01) ALA – #2 Jalen Hurts 7 yard run (#99 Adam Griffith kick) – ALA 31–3
  - (Q3, 6:00) ALA – #2 Jalen Hurts 6 yard run (#99 Adam Griffith kick) – ALA 38–3
  - (Q3, 0:01) USC – #39 Matt Boermeester 41 yard Field Goal – ALA 38–6
  Fourth Quarter
  - (Q4, 13:16) ALA – #9 Bo Scarbrough 6 yard run (#99 Adam Griffith kick) – ALA 45–6
  - (Q4, 9:34) ALA – #14 Gehrig Dieter 45 yard pass from #8 Blake Barnett (#99 Adam Griffith kick) – ALA 52–6

Game information

Top Passers

- USC – Max Browne – 14/29, 101 yards, INT
- ALA – Jalen Hurts – 6/11, 118 yards, 2 TD, INT

Top Rushers

- USC – Ronald Jones II – 7 carries, 46 yards
- ALA – Damien Harris – 9 rushes, 138 yards

Top Receiving

- USC – Darreus Rogers – 2 receptions, 45 yards
- ALA – ArDarius Stewart – 4 receptions, 113 yards, 2 TD

This game was the eighth meeting between the Trojans and Crimson Tide, and the first meeting between the two schools since the 1985 Aloha Bowl, which Alabama won 24–3. Alabama is now 6–2 in the series.

=== Western Kentucky ===
Western Kentucky Hilltoppers at Alabama Crimson Tide – Game summary

Quarter	1	2	3	4	Total
Western Kentucky	3	0	0	7	10
#1 Alabama	10	7	7	14	38

at Bryant-Denny Stadium • Tuscaloosa, AL

- Date: September 10, 2016
- Game time: 2:35 p.m.
- Game weather: 93, Warm and sunny, wind NW @ 4 mph
- Game attendance: 101,821
- Referee: John McDaid
- TV announcers (ESPN2):
  Beth Mowins (play-by-play)
  Anthony Becht (color)
  Rocky Boiman (sideline)
- Sources:
  First Quarter
  - (Q1, 9:10) ALA – #99 Adam Griffith 36 Yd Field Goal – ALA 3–0
  - (Q1, 8:03) WKU – #13 Ryan Nuss 25 Yd Field Goal – Tied 3–3
  - (Q1, 0:00) ALA – #3 Calvin Ridley 4 Yd pass from #2 Jalen Hurts (#99 Adam Griffith Kick) – ALA 10–3
  Second Quarter
  - (Q2, 8:59) ALA – #4 Eddie Jackson 55 Yd Interception Return (#99 Adam Griffith Kick) – ALA 17–3
  Third Quarter
  - (Q3, 3:48) ALA – #13 ArDarius Stewart 8 Yd pass from #2 Jalen Hurts (#99 Adam Griffith Kick) – ALA 24–3
  Fourth Quarter
  - (Q4, 13:14) ALA – #9 Bo Scarbrough 2 Yd Run (#99 Adam Griffith Kick) – ALA 31–3
  - (Q4, 4:27) ALA – #21 B.J. Emmons 6 Yd Run (#99 Adam Griffith Kick) – ALA 38–3
  - (Q4, 0:46) WKU – #11 Lucky Jackson 24 Yd pass from #4 Drew Eckels (#13 Ryan Nuss Kick) – ALA 38–10

Game information

Top Passers

- WKU – Mike White – 10/24, 135 yards, INT
- ALA – Jalen Hurts – 23/36, 287 yards, 2 TD

Top Rushers

- WKU – Anthony Wales – 11 carries, 44 yards
- ALA – Damien Harris – 11 carries, 45 yards

Top Receiving

- WKU – Taywan Taylor – 9 receptions, 121 yards
- ALA – Calvin Ridley – 9 receptions, 129 yards, TD

=== Ole Miss ===
Alabama Crimson Tide at Ole Miss Rebels – Game summary

Quarter	1	2	3	4	Total
#1 Alabama	3	14	17	14	48
#19 Ole Miss	7	17	3	16	43

at Vaught–Hemingway Stadium • Oxford, MS

- Date: September 17, 2016
- Game time: 2:40 p.m.
- Game weather: 83, Partly Cloudy, Wind WNW @ 5 mph
- Game attendance: 66,176
- Referee: Hubert Owens
- TV announcers (CBS):
  Verne Lundquist (play-by-play)
  Gary Danielson (color)
  Allie LaForce (sideline)
- Sources:
  First Quarter
  - (Q1, 13:07) MISS – #21 Akeem Judd 23-yard rush (#97 Gary Wunderlich PAT good) – MISS 7–0
  - (Q1, 5:54) ALA – #99 Adam Griffith 32-yard field goal – MISS 7–3
  Second Quarter
  - (Q2, 7:43) MISS – #97 Gary Wunderlich 23-yard field goal – MISS 10–3
  - (Q2, 4:40) MISS – #17 Evan Engram 63 Yd pass from #10 Chad Kelly (#97 Gary Wunderlich PAT good) – MISS 17–3
  - (Q2, 2:47) MISS – #47 John Youngblood 44-yard fumble return (#97 Gary Wunderlich PAT good) – MISS 24–3
  - (Q2, 2:10) ALA – #3 Calvin Ridley 6-yard rush (#99 Adam Griffith PAT good) – MISS 24–10
  - (Q2, 1:05) ALA – #4 Eddie Jackson 85-yard punt return (#99 Adam Griffith PAT good) – MISS 24–17
  Third Quarter
  - (Q3, 11:47) ALA – #94 Daron Payne 3-yard fumble return (#99 Adam Griffith PAT good) – Tied 24–24
  - (Q3, 6:03) ALA – #99 Adam Griffith 30-yard field goal – ALA 27–24
  - (Q3, 1:47) MISS – #97 Gary Wunderlich 18-yead field goal – Tied 27–27
  - (Q3, 0:16) ALA – #9 Bo Scarbrough 1-yard rush touchdown. (#99 Adam Griffith PAT good) – ALA 34–27
  Fourth Quarter
  - (Q4, 13:17) MISS – #97 Gart Wunderlich 38-yard field goal – ALA 34–30
  - (Q4, 7:33) ALA – #34 Damien Harris 1-yard rush (#99 Adam Griffith PAT good) – ALA 41–30
  - (Q4, 5:28) ALA – #93 Jonathan Allen 75-yard fumble return (#99 Adam Griffith PAT good) – ALA 48–30
  - (Q4, 2:59) MISS – #3 Damore'ea Stringfellow 5 Yd pass from #10 Chad Kelly (#97 Gary Wunderlich PAT good) – ALA 48–37
  - (Q4, 2:51) MISS – #1 A. J. Brown 37 Yd pass from #10 Chad Kelly (pass failed) – ALA 48–43

Game information

Top Passers

- ALA – Jalen Hurts – 19/31, 158 yds
- MISS – Chad Kelly 26/41, 421 yds, 3 TD, 1 INT

Top Rushers

- ALA – Jalen Hurts – 18 carries, 146 yds
- MISS – Chad Kelly – 13 carries, 48 yds

Top Receiving

- ALA – Calvin Ridley – 8 receptions, 81 yds
- MISS – Evan Engram – 9 receptions, 138 yds, TD

The Crimson Tide began conference play against Ole Miss, who entered the game on a two-game winning streak against Alabama, their longest winning streak in the series.

=== Kent State ===
Kent State Golden Flashes at Alabama Crimson Tide – Game summary

Quarter	1	2	3	4	Total
Kent State	0	0	0	0	0
#1 Alabama	21	20	7	0	48

at Bryant-Denny Stadium • Tuscaloosa, AL

- Date: September 24, 2016
- Game time: 11:01 a.m.
- Game weather: 84, Clear and sunny, Wind NNE @ 6 mph
- Game attendance: 101,821
- Referee: Lee Hedrick
- TV announcers (SEC Network):
  Tom Hart (play-by-play)
  Andre Ware (color)
  Cole Cubelic (sideline)
- Sources:
  First Quarter
  - (Q1, 12:14) ALA – #2 Jalen Hurts 20 Yd Run (#99 Adam Griffith Kick) – ALA 7–0
  - (Q1, 6:54) ALA – #25 Josh Jacobs 1 Yd Run (#99 Adam Griffith Kick) – ALA 14–0
  - (Q1, 3:39) ALA – #25 Josh Jacobs 25 Yd Run (#99 Adam Griffith Kick) – ALA 21–0
  Second Quarter
  - (Q2, 12:45) ALA – #99 Adam Griffith 28 Yd Field Goal – ALA 24–0
  - (Q2, 11:34) ALA – #99 Adam Griffith 48 Yd Field Goal – ALA 27–0
  - (Q2, 6:47) ALA – #88 O.J. Howard 34 Yd pass from #8 Blake Barnett (#99 Adam Griffith Kick) – ALA 34–0
  - (Q2, 2:14) ALA – #19 Xavian Marks 75 Yd Punt Return (#92 Andy Pappanastos Kick) – ALA 41–0
  Third Quarter
  - (Q3, 6:14) ALA – #30 Mack Wilson 1 Yd pass from #2 Jalen Hurts (#92 Andy Pappanastos Kick) – ALA 48–0
  Fourth Quarter
  No scoring plays.

Game information

Top Passers

- KSU – George Bollas – 4/8, 71 yards
- ALA – Jalen Hurts – 16/24, 164 yards, TD

Top Rushers

- KSU – Justin Rankin – 6 carries, 52 yards
- ALA – Josh Jacobs – 11 carries, 97 yards, 2 TD

Top Receiving

- KSU – Will Matthews – 2 receptions, 43 yards
- ALA – O. J. Howard – 3 receptions, 60 yards, TD

This was only the second meeting between these two schools, the first coming in 2012. Alabama coach Nick Saban is a graduate of Kent State.

=== Kentucky ===
Kentucky Wildcats at Alabama Crimson Tide – Game summary

Quarter	1	2	3	4	Total
Kentucky	3	0	0	3	6
#1 Alabama	3	14	14	3	34

at Bryant-Denny Stadium • Tuscaloosa, AL

- Date: October 1, 2016
- Game time: 6:11 p.m.
- Game weather: 77, Clear Skies, Wind NW @ 8 mph
- Game attendance: 101,821
- Referee: Brad Rogers
- TV announcers (ESPN):
  Dave Pasch (play-by-play)
  Greg McElroy (color)
  Tom Luginbill (sideline)
- Sources:
  First Quarter
  - (Q1, 8:52) UK – #99 Austin MacGinnis 45 Yd Field Goal – UK 3–0
  - (Q1, 1:15) ALA – #99 Adam Griffith 44 Yd Field Goal – Tied 3–3
  Second Quarter
  - (Q2, 9:50) ALA – #25 Josh Jacobs 1 Yd Run (#99 Adam Griffith Kick) – ALA 10–3
  - (Q2, 6:56) ALA – #15 Ronnie Harrison 55 Yd Fumble Recovery (#99 Adam Griffith Kick) – ALA 17–3
  Third Quarter
  - (Q3, 10:58) ALA – #3 Calvin Ridley 10 Yd pass from #2 Jalen Hurts (#99 Adam Griffith Kick) – ALA 24–3
  - (Q3, 4:31) ALA – #3 Calvin Ridley 19 Yd pass from #2 Jalen Hurts (#99 Adam Griffith Kick) – ALA 31–3
  Fourth Quarter
  - (Q4, 14:51) ALA – #99 Adam Griffith 24 Yd Field Goal – ALA 34–3
  - (Q4, 5:09) UK – #99 Austin MacGinnis 24 Yd Field Goal – ALA 34–6

Game information

Top Passers

- UK – Stephen Johnson – 13/22, 89 yards
- ALA – Jalen Hurts – 20/33, 262 yards, 2 TD

Top Rushers

- UK – Jojo Kemp – 10 carries, 39 yards
- ALA – Josh Jacobs – 16 carries, 100 yards, TD

Top Receiving

- UK – Garrett Johnson – 4 receptions, 27 yards
- ALA – Calvin Ridley – 11 receptions, 174 yards, 2 TD

=== Arkansas ===
Alabama Crimson Tide at Arkansas Razorbacks – Game summary

Quarter	1	2	3	4	Total
#1 Alabama	14	21	7	7	49
#16 Arkansas	7	10	7	6	30

at Donald W. Reynolds Razorback Stadium • Fayetteville, AR

- Date: October 8, 2016
- Game time: 6:06 p.m.
- Game weather: 66, Clear, Wind NNE @ 5 mph
- Game attendance: 75,459
- Referee: Matt Loeffler
- TV announcers (ESPN):
  Joe Tessitore (play-by-play)
  Todd Blackledge (color)
  Holly Rowe (sideline)
- Sources:
  First Quarter
  - (Q1, 7:27) ALA – #2 Jalen Hurts 5 Yd Run (#99 Adam Griffith Kick) – ALA 7–0
  - (Q1, 5:25) ALA – #2 Jalen Hurts 6 Yd Run (#99 Adam Griffith) – ALA 14–0
  - (Q1, 1:54) ARK – #83 Jeremy Sprinkle 24 Yd pass from #8 Austin Allen (#46 Adam McFain Kick) – ALA 14–7
  Second Quarter
  - (Q2, 12:25) ALA – #56 Tim Williams 23 Yd Fumble Return (#99 Adam Griffith Kick) – ALA 21–7
  - (Q2, 8:53) ALA – #34 Damien Harris 56 Yd pass from #2 Jalen Hurts (#99 Adam Griffith Kick) – ALA 28–7
  - (Q2, 2:56) ARK – #46 Adam McFain 25 Yd Field Goal – ALA 28–10
  - (Q2, 1:25) ALA – #9 Bo Scarbrough 21 Yd Run (#99 Adam Griffith Kick) – ALA 35–10
  - (Q2, 0:29) ALA – #4 Keon Hatcher 16 Yd pass from #8 Austin Allen (#46 Adam McFain Kick) – ALA 35–17
  Third Quarter
  - (Q3, 11:10) ALA – #3 Calvin Ridley 4 Yd pass from #2 Jalen Hurts (#99 Adam Griffith Kick) – ALA 42–17
  - (Q3, 0:29) ARK – #4 Keon Hatcher 10 Yd pass from #8 Austin Allen (#46 Adam McFain Kick) – ALA 42–24
  Fourth Quarter
  - (Q4, 10:18) – #29 Minkah Fitzpatrick 100 Yd Interception Return (#99 Adam Griffith Kick) – ALA 49–24
  - (Q4, 3:18) – #22 Rawleigh Williams III 3 Yd Run (pass failed) – ALA 49–30

Game information

Top Passers

- ALA – Jalen Hurts – 13/17, 253 yards, 2 TD, INT
- ARK – Austin Allen – 25/48, 400 yards, 3 TD, 3 INT

Top Rushers

- ALA – Damien Harris – 13 carries, 122 yards
- ARK – Rawleigh Williams III – 12 carries, 46 yards, TD

Top Receiving

- ALA – ArDarius Stewart – 5 receptions, 120 yards
- ARK – Jared Cornelius – 5 receptions, 146 yards

=== Tennessee ===
Alabama Crimson Tide at Tennessee Volunteers – Game summary

Quarter	1	2	3	4	Total
#1 Alabama	14	7	14	14	49
#9 Tennessee	0	7	3	0	10

at Neyland Stadium • Knoxville, TN

- Date: October 15, 2016
- Game time: 3:39 p.m.
- Game weather: 82, Sunny, Wind SW @ 8 mph
- Game attendance: 102,455
- Referee: Ken Williamson
- TV announcers (CBS):
  Verne Lundquist (play-by-play)
  Gary Danielson (color)
  Allie LaForce (sideline)
- Sources:
  First Quarter
  - (Q1, 3:29) ALA – #13 ArDarius Stewart 36 Yd pass from #2 Jalen Hurts (#99 Adam Griffith Kick) – ALA 7–0
  - (Q1, 0:14) ALA – #15 Ronnie Harrison 58 Yd Interception Return (#99 Adam Griffith Kick) – ALA 14–0
  Second Quarter
  - (Q2, 9:41) TENN – #6 Alvin Kamara 7 Yd Run (#25 Aaron Medley Kick) – ALA 14–7
  - (Q2, 7:22) ALA – #2 Jalen Hurts 45 Yd Run (#99 Adam Griffith Kick) – ALA 21–7
  Third Quarter
  - (Q3, 9:02) ALA – #2 Jalen Hurts 2 Yd Run (#99 Adam Griffith Kick) – ALA 28–7
  - (Q3, 4:03) TENN – #25 Aaron Medley 37 Yd Field Goal – ALA 28–10
  - (Q3, 0:49) ALA – #2 Jalen Hurts 1 Yd Run (#99 Adam Griffith Kick) – ALA 35–10
  Fourth Quarter
  - (Q4, 14:42) ALA – #4 Eddie Jackson 79 Yd Punt Return (#99 Adam Griffith Kick) – ALA 42–10
  - (Q4, 11:38) ALA – #9 Bo Scarbrough 85 Yd Run (#99 Adam Griffith Kick) – ALA 49–10

Game information

Top Passers

- ALA – Jalen Hurts – 17/27, 172 yards, TD, INT
- TENN – Joshua Dobbs – 16/27, 92 yards, INT

Top Rushers

- ALA – Jalen Hurts – 12 carries, 132 yards, 3 TD
- TENN – Jalen Hurd – 13 carries, 28 yards

Top Receiving

- ALA – ArDarius Stewart – 8 receptions, 90 yards, TD
- TENN – Josh Malone – 5 receptions, 61 yards

=== Texas A&M ===
Texas A&M Aggies at Alabama Crimson Tide – Game summary

Quarter	1	2	3	4	Total
#6 Texas A&M	0	7	7	0	14
#2 Alabama	6	7	13	7	33

at Bryant-Denny Stadium • Tuscaloosa, AL

- Date: October 22, 2016
- Game time: 2:39 p.m.
- Game weather: 71, Clear & Sunny, Wind N @ 10 mph
- Game attendance: 101,821
- Referee: John McDaid
- TV announcers (CBS):
  Verne Lundquist (play-by-play)
  Gary Danielson (color)
  Allie LaForce (sideline)
- Sources:
  First Quarter
  - ALA 12:22 – Adam Griffith 32 yard field goal, ALA 3–0
  - ALA 4:48 – Adam Griffith 28 yard field goal, ALA 6–0
  Second Quarter
  - ALA 12:59 – O. J. Howard 5 yard pass from Jalen Hurts (Adam Griffith kick), ALA 13–0
  - TAMU 0:38 – Josh Reynolds 9 yard pass from Trevor Knight (Daniel LaCamera kick), ALA 13–7
  Third Quarter
  - TAMU 12:54 – Christian Kirk 25 yard pass from Trevor Knight (Daniel LaCamera kick), TAMU 14–13
  - ALA 6:33 – Calvin Ridley 4 yard pass from Jalen Hurts (Adam Griffith kick), ALA 20–14
  - ALA 0:23 – Jonathan Allen 30 yard fumble recovery (two-point conversion failed), ALA 26–14
  Fourth Quarter
  - ALA 12:27 – Jalen Hurts 37 yard run (Adam Griffith kick), ALA 33–14

Game information

Top Passers

- TAM – Trevor Knight – 14/31, 164 yards, 2 TD, INT
- ALA – Jalen Hurts – 15/25, 164 yards, 2 TD, 2 INT

Top Rushers

- TAM – Keith Ford – 15 carries, 62 yards
- ALA – Damien Harris – 17 carries, 128 yards

Top Receiving

- TAM – Christian Kirk – 9 receptions, 58 yards, TD
- ALA – O. J. Howard – 8 receptions, 69 yards, TD

=== LSU ===
Alabama Crimson Tide at LSU Tigers – Game summary

Quarter	1	2	3	4	Total
#1 Alabama	0	0	0	10	10
#15 LSU	0	0	0	0	0

at Tiger Stadium • Baton Rouge, LA

- Date: November 5, 2016
- Game time: 7:10 p.m.
- Game weather: 70, Clear, Wind 3 mph
- Game attendance: 102,321
- Referee: Matt Austin
- TV announcers (CBS):
  Verne Lundquist (play-by-play)
  Gary Danielson (color)
  Allie LaForce (sideline)
- Sources:
  First Quarter
  Second Quarter
  Third Quarter
  Fourth Quarter

Game information

Top Passers

- ALA –
- LSU –

Top Rushers

- ALA –
- LSU –

Top Receiving

- ALA –
- LSU –

=== Mississippi State ===
Mississippi State Bulldogs at Alabama Crimson Tide – Game summary

Quarter	1	2	3	4	Total
Mississippi State	0	0	3	0	3
#1 Alabama	10	20	14	7	51

at Bryant Denny Stadium • Tuscaloosa, AL

- Date: November 12, 2016
- Game time: 11:02 a.m.
- Game weather: 64, Clear and Sunny, Wind NE @ 9 mph
- Game attendance: 101,821
- Referee: Matt Loeffler
- TV announcers (ESPN):
  Joe Tessitore (play-by-play)
  Todd Blackledge (color)
  Holly Rowe (sideline)
- Sources:
  First Quarter
  Second Quarter
  Third Quarter
  Fourth Quarter

Game information

Top Passers

- MSU –
- ALA –

Top Rushers

- MSU –
- ALA –

Top Receiving

- MSU –
- ALA –

=== Chattanooga ===
Chattanooga Mocs at Alabama Crimson Tide – Game summary

Quarter	1	2	3	4	Total
#12 (FCS) Chattanooga	3	0	0	0	3
#1 Alabama	0	14	7	10	31

at Bryant-Denny Stadium • Tuscaloosa, AL

- Date: November 19, 2016
- Game time: 6:05 p.m.
- Game weather: 50, Clear Skies, Wind NNW @ 10 mph
- Game attendance: 101,821
- Referee: Marc Curles
- TV announcers (ESPN2):
  Dave Neal (play-by-play)
  Matt Stinchcomb (color)
  Olivia Harlan (sideline)
- Sources:
  First Quarter
  Second Quarter
  Third Quarter
  Fourth Quarter

Game information

Top Passers

- UTC –
- ALA –

Top Rushers

- UTC –
- ALA –

Top Receiving

- UTC –
- ALA –

=== Auburn ===
Auburn Tigers at Alabama Crimson Tide – Game summary

Quarter	1	2	3	4	Total
#16 Auburn	3	6	3	0	12
#2 Alabama	10	3	14	3	30

at Bryant-Denny Stadium • Tuscaloosa, AL

- Date: November 26, 2016
- Game time: 2:38 p.m.
- Game weather: 62, Partly Cloudy, Wind at N @ 6 mph
- Game attendance: 101,821
- Referee: John McDaid
- TV announcers (CBS):
  Verne Lundquist (play-by-play)
  Gary Danielson (color)
  Allie LaForce (sideline)
- Sources:
  First Quarter
  - Auburn – Daniel Carlson 42-yard field goal (Auburn 3–0)
  - Alabama – Adam Griffith 28-yard field goal (Tie 3–3)
  - Alabama – Damien Harris 17-yard TD pass reception from Jalen Hurts (Alabama 10–3)
  Second Quarter
  - Auburn – Daniel Carlson 52-yard field goal (Alabama 10–6)
  - Auburn – Daniel Carlson 39-yard field goal (Alabama 10–9)
  - Alabama – Adam Griffith 25-yard field goal (Alabama 13–9)
  Third Quarter
  - Alabama – Jalen Hurts 17-yard TD run (Alabama 20–9)
  - Alabama – ArDarius Stewart 34-yard touchdown reception from Jalen Hurts (Alabama 27–9)
  - Auburn – Daniel Carlson 27-yard field goal (Alabama 27–12)
  Fourth Quarter
  - Alabama – Adam Griffith 34-yard field goal (Alabama 30–12)

Game information

Top Passers

- AUB –
- ALA –

Top Rushers

- AUB –
- ALA –

Top Receiving

- AUB –
- ALA –

=== Florida—SEC Championship ===
Alabama Crimson Tide vs Florida Gators- Game Summary

Quarter	1	2	3	4	Total
#1 Alabama	16	17	7	14	54
#15 Florida	9	7	0	0	16

at Georgia Dome • Atlanta, GA

- Date: December 3, 2016
- Game time: 4:11 p.m.
- Game weather: Indoors (dome stadium)
- Game attendance: 74,632
- Referee: Matt Loeffler
- TV announcers (CBS):
  Verne Lundquist (play-by-play)
  Gary Danielson (color)
  Allie LaForce (sideline)

=== Washington—CFP Semifinal ===
Washington Huskies vs Alabama Crimson Tide – Game Summary

Quarter	1	2	3	4	Total
#4 Washington	7	0	0	0	7
#1 Alabama	7	10	0	7	24

at Georgia Dome • Atlanta, GA

- Date: December 31, 2016
- Game time: 3:10 p.m.
- Game weather: Indoors (dome stadium)
- Game attendance: 75,996
- Referee: Dan Capron
- TV announcers (ESPN):
  Joe Tessitore (play-by-play)
  Todd Blackledge (color)
  Holly Rowe (sideline)

=== Clemson—CFP National Championship ===
Clemson Tigers vs Alabama Crimson Tide – Game Summary

Quarter	1	2	3	4	Total
#2 Clemson	0	7	7	21	35
#1 Alabama	7	7	10	7	31

at Raymond James Stadium • Tampa, FL

- Date: January 9, 2017
- Game time: 8:19 p.m.
- Game weather: 56, Fair
- Game attendance: 74,512
- Referee: Mike DeFee
- TV announcers (ESPN):
  Chris Fowler (play-by-play)
  Kirk Herbstreit (color)
  Samantha Ponder (sideline)
  Tom Rinaldi (sideline)

== Rankings ==
Ranking movements Legend: ██ Increase in ranking ██ Decrease in ranking ( ) = First-place votes
	Week															
Poll	Pre	1	2	3	4	5	6	7	8	9	10	11	12	13	14	Final
AP	1 (33)	1 (54)	1 (56)	1 (50)	1 (50)	1 (53)	1 (56)	1 (60)	1 (60)	1 (60)	1 (60)	1 (61)	1 (61)	1 (61)	1 (61)	2
Coaches	1 (55)	1 (62)	1 (62)	1 (59)	1 (61)	1 (57)	1 (58)	1 (61)	1 (63)	1 (63)	1 (62)	1 (63)	1 (63)	1 (64)	1 (65)	2
CFP	Not released									1	1	1	1	1	1	Not released

== Personnel ==
=== Coaching staff ===
Name	Position	Consecutive season at Alabama in current position
Nick Saban	Head coach	10th
Burton Burns	Associate head coach, running backs coach	10th
Lane Kiffin	Offensive coordinator, quarterbacks coach	3rd
Karl Dunbar	Defensive line coach	1st
Jeremy Pruitt	Defensive coordinator, inside linebackers	1st
Mario Cristobal	Offensive tackles and tight ends, recruiting coordinator	4th
Billy Napier	Wide receivers	4th
Tosh Lupoi	Outside linebackers	2nd
Derrick Ansley	Defensive backs	1st
Brent Key	Interior offensive line and special teams	1st
Scott Cochran	Strength and conditioning	10th

Graduate assistants

- Brian Niedermeyer
- Doug Belk
- Rob Ezell

Analysts

- William Vlachos
- Mike Locksley
- Shea Tierney
- Steve Sarkisian
- Charlie Weis Jr.
- Garrett Cox
- Freddie Roach
- Brendan Farrell

=== Roster ===
2016 Alabama Crimson Tide Football
Quarterback: 2 Jalen Hurts – freshman (6'2, 210); 11 Josh Palet – senior (6'5, 215); 12 David Cornwell – sophomore (6'5, 234); 18 Cooper Bateman – junior (6'3, 224); 19 Montana Murphy – freshman (6'3, 201); Running back: 5 Ronnie Clark – sophomore (6'2, 217) (+DB); 21 B. J. Emmons – freshman (6'0, 220); 9 Bo Scarbrough – sophomore (6'2, 230); 25 Joshua Jacobs – freshman (5'10, 200); 31 Xavian Marks – sophomore (5'8, 163); 33 Derrick Gore – junior (5'11, 212); 34 Damien Harris – sophomore (5'11, 214); 43 Lawrence Erekosima – junior (5'7, 180); 44 Avery Reid – sophomore (6'0, 192); Wide receiver: 1 Robert Foster – junior (6'2, 191); 3 Calvin Ridley – sophomore (6'1, 188); 7 Trevon Diggs – freshman (6'2, 185); 13 ArDarius Stewart – junior (6'1, 204); 11 Gehrig Dieter – senior (6'3, 207); 16 T.J. Simmons – freshman (6'2, 196); 17 Cam Sims – junior (6'5, 206); 31 Donne Lee Jr. – junior (6'0, 180); 35 Thomas Woods – junior (5'6, 165); 36 Torin Marks – (redshirt) freshman (5'11, 175); 37 Jonathan Rice – sophomore (6'4, 207); 38 Austin Johnson – sophomore (6'2, 200); 39 Tre' Dunn – junior (6'0, 170); 41 Parker Bearden – sophomore (6'1, 201); 47 Josh Pugh – sophomore (6'1, 208); 80 Raheem Falkins – senior (6'4, 202); 81 Derek Kief – sophomore (6'4, 200); 89 Armani Purifoye – junior (6'0, 190); Placekicker: 92 Andy Pappanastos – (redshirt) junior (5'11, 198); 96 Gunnar Raborn – junior (5'9, 180); 99 Adam Griffith – (redshirt) senior (5'10, 193); Punter: 15 J. K. Scott – junior (6'5, 198); 98 Brannon Satterfield – sophomore (6'2, 210)	Tight end: 42 Jacob Parker – junior (6'1, 224); 44 Dakota Ball – senior (6'3, 268) (+DL); 45 Hunter Bryant – junior (6'5, 226); 49 Brandon Moore – senior (6'0, 248); 82 Irv Smith Jr. – freshman (6'4, 235); 83 Cam Stewart – freshman (6'8, 254); 84 Hale Hentges – sophomore (6'5, 256); 86 Truett Harris – senior (6'3, 235); 87 Miller Forristall– freshman (6'5, 220); 88 O. J. Howard – senior (6'6, 242); 89 Brandon Greene – senior (6'5, 307); Offensive lineman: 50 Alphonse Taylor – senior (6'5, 345); 56 Brandon Kennedy – (redshirt) freshman (6'3, 302); 59 Dallas Warmack – sophomore (6'2, 299); 60 Malik Martin – sophomore (6'3, 370); 61 Jacob Probasco – freshman (6'3, 317); 62 Will Davis – senior (6'5, 325); 63 J. C. Hassenauer – junior (6'2, 297); 65 Deonte Brown – freshman (6'4, 350); 66 Lester Cotton – sophomore (6'4, 319); 67 Josh Casher – sophomore (6'1, 284); 71 Ross Pierschbacher – sophomore (6'4, 304); 72 Richie Petitbon – (redshirt) freshman (6'4, 300); 73 Jonah Williams – freshman (6'5, 280); 74 Cam Robinson – junior (6'6, 327); 75 Bradley Bozeman – junior (6'5, 312); 76 Scott Lashley – freshman (6'7, 325); 77 Matt Womack – (redshirt) freshman (6'7, 320); 78 Korren Kirven – senior (6'4, 308) (+DL); 79 Chris Owens – freshman (6'3, 307); Defensive lineman: 9 Da'Shawn Hand – junior (6'4, 278); 36 Johnny Dwight – sophomore (6'3, 306) (+TE); 51 Jake Long – senior (5'9, 228); 54 Dalvin Tomlinson – (redshirt) senior (6'3, 307); 58 Daniel Powell – freshman (5'11, 238); 69 Joshua Frazier – junior (6'4, 315); 90 Jamar King – junior (6'4, 290); 91 O.J. Smith – sophomore (6'2, 315); 92 Quinnen Williams – freshman (6'4, 265); 93 Jonathan Allen – senior (6'3, 294); 94 Daron Payne – sophomore (6'2, 319); 99 Raekwon Davis – freshman (6'7, 325)	Linebacker: 1 Ben Davis – freshman (6'4, 240); 3 Mack Wilson – freshman (6'2, 240); 10 Reuben Foster – senior (6'1, 240); 16 Jamey Mosley – sophomore (6'5, 226); 19 Shawn Jennings – freshman (6'1, 228); 20 Shaun Dion Hamilton – junior (6'0, 232); 22 Ryan Anderson – (redshirt) senior (6'2, 253); 24 Terrell Hall – freshman (6'5, 245); 31 Keaton Anderson – (redshirt) freshman (6'1, 215); 32 Rashaan Evans – junior (6'3, 230); 33 Anfernee Jennings – (redshirt) freshman (6'3, 268); 40 Joshua McMillon – (redshirt) freshman (6'3, 245); 42 Keith Holcombe – sophomore (6'4, 227); 46 Derrick Garnett – junior (6'1, 240); 47 Christian Miller – sophomore (6'4, 230); 48 Mekhi Brown – (redshirt) freshman (6'5, 243); 56 Tim Williams – senior (6'4, 237); Defensive back: 2 Tony Brown – junior (6'0, 194); 4 Eddie Jackson – senior (6'0, 194); 5 Shyheim Carter – freshman (6'0, 190); 6 Hootie Jones – junior (6'2, 214); 8 Jared Mayden – freshman (6'0, 198); 13 Nigel Knott – freshman (5'11, 190); 14 Deionte Thompson – (redshirt) freshman (6'2, 190) (+WR); 15 Ronnie Harrison – sophomore (6'3, 216); 21 Rogria Lewis – junior (5'11, 196); 23 Aaron Robinson – freshman (6'1, 185); 26 Marlon Humphrey – (redshirt) sophomore (6'1, 198); 28 Anthony Averett – junior (6'0, 180); 29 Minkah Fitzpatrick – sophomore (6'1, 200); 34 Nate Staskelunas – senior (6'3, 207); 37 Donavan Mosley – sophomore (5'10, 185); 41 Blaine Anderson – senior (5'10, 187); 44 Levi Wallace – junior (6'0, 170); 47 Bo Grant – senior (6'2, 195); Longsnappers: 53 Ryan Parris – sophomore (6'0, 209); 55 Cole Mazza – senior (6'2, 235)
: 2016 Alabama Crimson Tide Football Commits (08/05/2016)

=== Depth chart ===
Defense

FS
Ronnie Harrison
Deionte Thompson
⋅

JACK	ILB	ILB	SAM
Tim Williams	Reuben Foster	Shaun Dion Hamilton	Ryan Anderson
Anfernee Jennings	Rashaan Evans	Keith Holcombe	Christian Miller
Terrell Hall	Mack Wilson	⋅	Jamey Mosley

SS
Eddie Jackson
Tony Brown
Hootie Jones

CB
Marlon Humphrey
Anthony Averett
⋅

DE	NT	DE
Dalvin Tomlinson	Daron Payne	Jonathan Allen
Dakota Ball	Joshua Frazier	Da'Shawn Hand
⋅	⋅	⋅

CB
Minkah Fitzpatrick
Shyheim Carter
⋅

Offense

WR
Calvin Ridley
Cam Sims
Xavian Marks

LT	LG	C	RG	RT
Cam Robinson	Ross Pierschbacher	Bradley Bozeman	Alphonse Taylor	Jonah Williams
Matt Womack	Dallas Warmack	J. C. Hassenauer	Korren Kirven	Lester Cotton
⋅	⋅	Josh Casher	Brandon Kennedy	⋅

TE
O. J. Howard
Hale Hentges
Miller Forristall

WR
ArDarius Stewart
Robert Foster
Raheem Falkins

QB
Jalen Hurts
Cooper Bateman
David Cornwell

RB
Damien Harris
Josh Jacobs
Bo Scarbrough

FB
⋅
⋅
⋅

Special teams
PK Adam Griffith
P J. K. Scott
KR ArDarius Stewart
Gehrig Dieter
PR Trevon Diggs
LS Cole Mazza
H Cooper Bateman

== Statistics ==
=== Team ===
Team Statistics
	Alabama	Opponents
Points		
First Downs		
Rushing		
Passing		
Penalty		
Rushing Yards		
Rushing Attempts		
Average Per Rush		
Long		
Rushing TDs		
Passing Yards		
Comp–Att		
Comp %		
Average Per Game		
Average per Attempt		
Passing TDs		
INT's		
Rating		
Touchdowns		
Passing		
Rushing		
Defensive		
Interceptions		
Yards		
Long		
Total Offense		
Total Plays		
Average Per Yards/Game		
Kick Returns: # – Yards		
TDs		
Long		
Punts		
Yards		
Average		
Punt Returns: # – Yards		
TDs		
Long		
Fumbles – Fumbles Lost		
Opposing TD's		
Penalties – Yards		
3rd–Down Conversions		
4th–Down Conversions		
Takeaways		
Field Goals		
Extra Point		
Sacks		
Sack Against		
Yards		

=== Offense ===
Passing Statistics
#	NAME	POS	RAT	CMP	ATT	YDS	CMP%	TD	INT

Rushing Statistics
#	NAME	POS	CAR	YDS	LONG	TD
	TOTALS					

Receiving Statistics
#	NAME	POS	REC	YDS	LONG	TD
	TOTALS					

=== Defense ===
|- Key: POS: Position, SOLO: Solo Tackles, AST: Assisted Tackles, TOT: Total Tackles, TFL: Tackles-for-loss, SACK: Quarterback Sacks, INT: Interceptions, BU: Passes Broken Up, PD: Passes Defended, QBH: Quarterback Hits, FF: Forced Fumbles, FR: Fumbles Recovered, BLK: Kicks or Punts Blocked, SAF: Safeties

Defensive Statistics
#	NAME	POS	SOLO	AST	TOT	TFL-YDS	SACKS	INT-YDS	BU	PD	QBH	FR–YDS	FF	BLK	SAF
	TOTAL		0	0	0	0 – 0	0 – 0	0 – 0	0	0	0	0 – 0	0	–	–
	OPPONENTS		0	0	0	0–0	0–0	0–0	0	0	0	0–0	0	0	–

Interceptions Statistics
#	NAME	POS	RTNS	YDS	AVG	TD	LNG
	TOTALS						

=== Special teams ===
Kicking statistics
#	NAME	POS	XPM	XPA	XP%	FGM	FGA	FG%	1–19	20–29	30–39	40–49	50+	LNG	PTS
	TOTALS														

Kick return statistics
#	NAME	POS	RTNS	YDS	AVG	TD	LNG
	TOTALS						

Punting statistics
#	NAME	POS	PUNTS	YDS	AVG	LONG	TB	FC	I–20	50+	BLK
	TOTALS										

Punt return statistics
#	NAME	POS	RTNS	YDS	AVG	TD	LONG
	TOTALS						

=== Scores by quarter (all opponents) ===
	1	2	3	4	Total
All opponents					0
Alabama					0

=== Scores by quarter (SEC opponents) ===
	1	2	3	4	Total
SEC opponents	0	0	0	0	0
Alabama	0	0	0	0	0

== Postseason and awards ==
=== Preseason award watchlists ===
Overall awards

Offensive awards

Defensive awards

=== Semifinalists ===
Players

Coaches

=== Finalists ===
Players

Coaches

=== Honors ===
Week 1

Week 2

Week 3

Week 4

Week 5

Week 6

Week 7

Week 8

Week 9

Week 10

Week 11

Week 12

Week 13

Week 14

- Bye

Preseason All-SEC Team

First-Team Offense

O.J. Howard – TE

Cam Robinson – OL

Calvin Ridley – WR

Second-Team Offense

Alphonse Taylor – OL

Third-Team Offense

Ross Pierschbacher – C

First-Team Defense

Jonathan Allen – DL

Reuben Foster – LB

Eddie Jackson – DB

Second-Team Defense

Third-Team Defense

First-Team Special Teams

Preseason All-Americans

==== All-Americans ====
Each year several publications release lists of their ideal "team". The athletes on these lists are referred to as All-Americans. The NCAA recognizes five All-American lists. They are the Associated Press (AP), American Football Coaches Association (AFCA), Football Writers Association of America (FWAA), Sporting News (SN), and the Walter Camp Football Foundation (WCFF). If a player is selected to the first team of three publications he is considered a consensus All-American, if a player is selected to the first team of all five publications he is considered a unanimous All-American.

Key:
First team
Consensus All-American
Unanimous All-American

==== SEC All-Conference Team ====
The Crimson Tide had TBA players honored as members of the 2016 SEC All-Conference team, with five each on the first and second teams, respectively. TBA other Crimson Tide earned honorable mention honors.

- First Team
- Second Team
- Honorable Mention

=== All-Academic Teams ===
==== SEC Conference All-Academic Players ====
The Crimson Tide had two players selected to the Southeastern Conference All-Academic Second Team, six players granted honorable mention and no players selected to the First Team. In order to be eligible for the academic team a player must maintain a minimum 3.0 overall grade-point average and play in at least 50 percent of their team's games.

- First team
- Second Team
- Honorable Mention

=== Postseason games ===
Senior Bowl

All Star Game

== 2017 NFL draft ==
The 2017 NFL draft was held on April 27–29 in Philadelphia. Ten Alabama players were selected as part of the draft, the second most in the draft behind Michigan's 11. Two additional Alabama players were signed to NFL teams as undrafted free agents.

Player	Position	Round	Overall pick	NFL team
Marlon Humphrey	CB	1	16	Baltimore Ravens
Jonathan Allen	DE	1	17	Washington Redskins
O. J. Howard	TE	1	19	Tampa Bay Buccaneers
Reuben Foster	LB	1	31	San Francisco 49ers
Cam Robinson	OT	2	34	Jacksonville Jaguars
Ryan Anderson	LB	2	49	Washington Redskins
Dalvin Tomlinson	DT	2	55	New York Giants
Tim Williams	LB	3	78	Baltimore Ravens
ArDarius Stewart	WR	3	79	New York Jets
Eddie Jackson	S	4	112	Chicago Bears
Gehrig Dieter	WR	Undrafted		Kansas City Chiefs
Korren Kirven	OL	Undrafted		Tampa Bay Buccaneers
