= Adam Griffith (disambiguation) =

Adam Griffith is an Australian cricketer.

Adam Griffith may also refer to:

- Adam Griffith (American football), American football player
- Adam Griffiths (born 1979), Australian football (soccer) player
