= Ronnie Harrison =

American football player (born 1997)

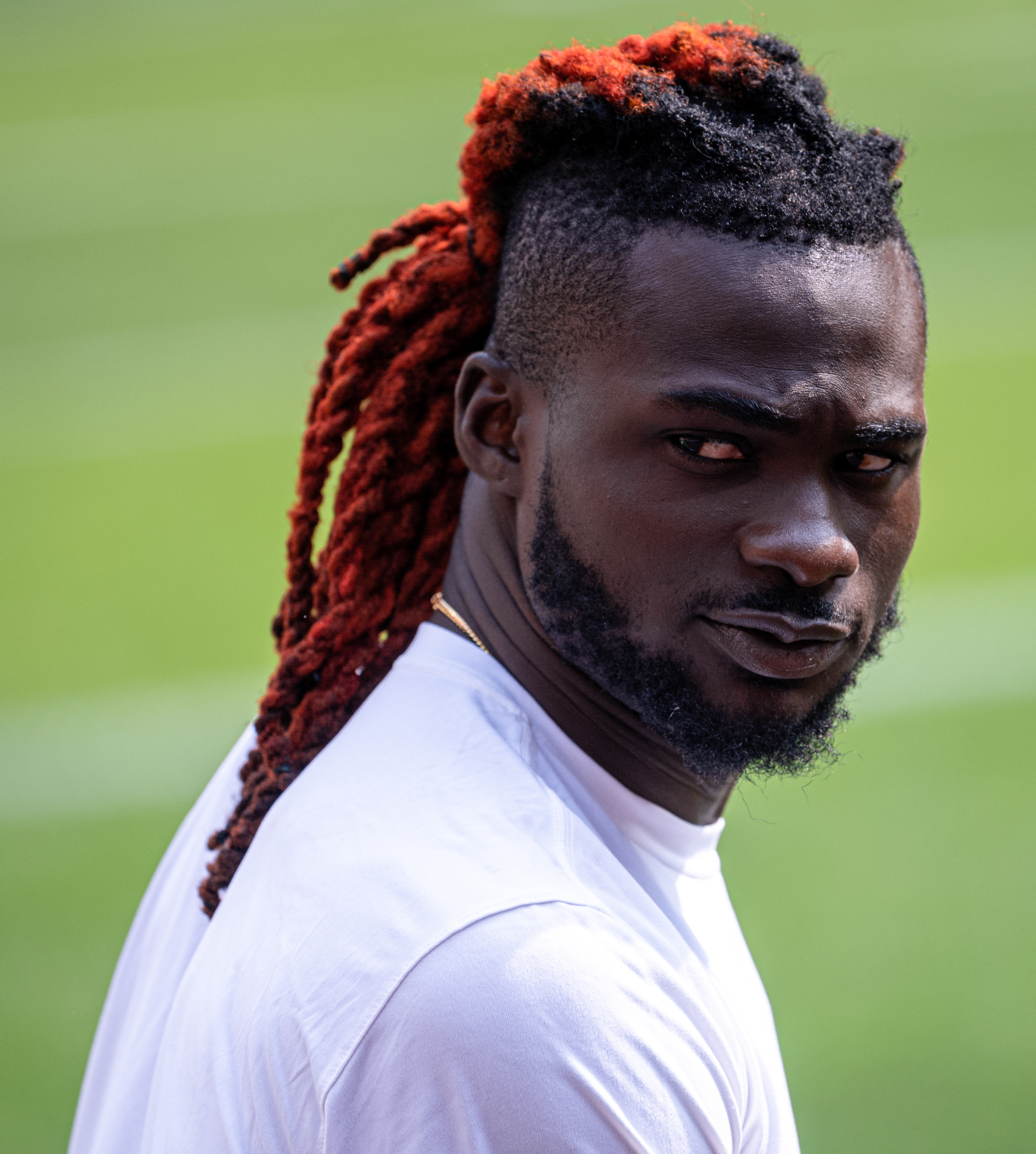
- Harrison with the Cleveland Browns in 2021

No. 56 – Miami Dolphins
- Position: Linebacker
- Roster status: Injured reserve

Personal information
- Born: April 18, 1997 (age 29); Tallahassee, Florida, U.S.
- Listed height: 6 ft 2 in (1.88 m)
- Listed weight: 220 lb (100 kg)

Career information
- High school: Florida State University School (Tallahassee)
- College: Alabama (2015–2017)
- NFL draft: 2018: 3rd round, 93rd overall pick

Career history
- Jacksonville Jaguars (2018–2019); Cleveland Browns (2020–2022); Indianapolis Colts (2023–2024); Atlanta Falcons (2025); Miami Dolphins (2026–present)

Awards and highlights
- 2× CFP national champion (2015, 2017); First-team All-SEC (2017)

Career NFL statistics as of 2025
- Total tackles: 274
- Sacks: 8.5
- Forced fumbles: 1
- Fumble recoveries: 2
- Interceptions: 7
- Pass deflections: 27
- Defensive touchdowns: 2
- Stats at Pro Football Reference

Ronnie Harrison Jr. (born April 18, 1997) is an American professional football linebacker for the Miami Dolphins of the National Football League (NFL). He played college football for the Alabama Crimson Tide and was selected by the Jacksonville Jaguars in the third round of the 2018 NFL draft.

== Early life ==
Harrison played both quarterback and safety at Florida State University School. As a senior, he had 39 tackles on defense and 2,076 passing yards with 13 touchdowns, 1,015 rushing yards and 16 rushing touchdowns on offense. Harrison committed to the University of Alabama to play college football.

== College career ==
As a true freshman at Alabama in 2015, Harrison was a backup, recording 17 tackles, two interceptions, and one sack. As a sophomore, he took over as the starter, recording 86 tackles, two interceptions, and one touchdown.

== Professional career ==
=== Pre-draft ===
On January 11, 2018, Harrison announced his decision to forgo his remaining eligibility and enter the 2018 NFL draft. Harrison attended the NFL Scouting Combine in Indianapolis, but opted to only perform the broad jump and vertical jump. On March 7, 2018, he attended Alabama's pro day and performed the 40-yard dash, 20-yard dash, and 10-yard dash. Harrison received interest and was regarded as a top prospect at his position due to his combination of size and athleticism. He attended visit and private workouts with multiple teams, including the New York Giants, Pittsburgh Steelers, Detroit Lions, Tennessee Titans, Jacksonville Jaguars, Minnesota Vikings, New England Patriots, Cincinnati Bengals, Carolina Panthers, Seattle Seahawks, Houston Texans, and Philadelphia Eagles. At the conclusion of the pre-draft process, Harrison was projected to be a second round pick by NFL draft experts and scouts. He was ranked as the second best strong safety prospect in the draft by DraftScout.com, was ranked the third best safety by NFL analyst Mike Mayock, and was also ranked the fourth best safety in the draft by Scouts Inc.

External videos
- Ronnie Harrison's NFL Combine Workout
- Ronnie Harrison's College Highlights

Pre-draft measurables
Height	Weight	Arm length	Hand span	Wingspan	40-yard dash	10-yard split	20-yard split	Vertical jump	Broad jump
6 ft 2 in (1.88 m)	207 lb (94 kg)	33 3/8 in (0.85 m)	9 1/2 in (0.24 m)	6 ft 8 3/8 in (2.04 m)	4.63 s	1.58 s	2.64 s	34.0 in (0.86 m)	10 ft 0 in (3.05 m)
All values from NFL Combine/Alabama's Pro Day

=== Jacksonville Jaguars ===
==== 2018 ====
The Jaguars selected Harrison in the third round with the 93rd overall pick in the 2018 NFL draft. Harrison was the seventh safety drafted in 2018.

External videos
- Jaguars draft Ronnie Harrison 93rd overall

On May 24, 2018, the Jaguars signed Harrison to a four-year, $3.38 million contract that includes a signing bonus of $803,032. Harrison entered his rookie season slated as the backup strong safety behind Barry Church. He was named the starter in Week 13 after Church was a healthy scratch. He was officially named the starter the rest of the season on December 14, 2018, after Church was released by the Jaguars. However, in the next game in Week 15, Harrison suffered a season-ending knee injury and was placed on injured reserve on December 17, 2018.

==== 2019 ====
In a Week 3 win against the Titans in 2019, Harrison led the team with 10 tackles. The following week against the Denver Broncos, Harrison recorded his first interception of the season off Joe Flacco. In a Week 7 win against the Bengals, Harrison recovered a fumble forced by teammate DJ Hayden and recorded an interception.

=== Cleveland Browns ===
==== 2020 ====
Harrison was traded to the Cleveland Browns on September 3, 2020, in exchange for the Browns' fifth-round pick in the 2021 NFL draft. In Week 5 against the Indianapolis Colts, Harrison intercepted a pass thrown by Philip Rivers and returned it for a 47-yard touchdown during the 32–23 win. This was Harrison's first interception as a Brown and first touchdown in the NFL. In Week 7 against the Bengals, Harrison led the team with 9 tackles (6 solo), sacked Joe Burrow once, and recovered a fumble lost by Burrow during the 37–34 win. Harrison was placed on injured reserve on December 1, 2020, with a shoulder injury. On December 30, 2020, Harrison was activated off of injured reserve. He was placed on the reserve/COVID-19 list by the team on January 7, 2021, and activated two days later.

==== 2021 ====
During Week 1 against the Kansas City Chiefs, Harrison was disqualified after appearing to step on Chiefs running back Clyde Edwards-Helaire and shoving Chiefs running backs coach Greg Lewis after Lewis shoved him. On October 18, Harrison was fined $12,128.

==== 2022 ====
On April 12, 2022, Harrison signed a contract to return to the Browns.

=== Indianapolis Colts ===
On August 14, 2023, Harrison signed with the Colts. He was released on August 29, 2023 and re-signed to the practice squad. On November 21, the Colts promoted him to their active roster, as well as announced his position switch from safety to linebacker. In his first game with Indianapolis, a Week 12 home game against the Tampa Bay Buccaneers, Harrison intercepted a Baker Mayfield pass in the 1st quarter. Two weeks later, during the loss to the Bengals, he intercepted a pass by Jake Browning and returned it 36 yards for a touchdown.

On March 13, 2024, the Colts re-signed Harrison to a one-year contract. He was released on August 25, and later re-signed to the practice squad. He was promoted to the active roster on October 28.

=== Atlanta Falcons ===
On August 10, 2025, Harrison signed with the Atlanta Falcons. He was waived on August 26 as part of final roster cuts and re-signed to the practice squad the next day. On October 25, Harrison was signed to the active roster.

=== Miami Dolphins ===
On March 25, 2026, Harrison signed a one-year contract with the Miami Dolphins. On September 19, Harrison was placed on injured reserve due to a hamstring injury.

== Career statistics ==
=== NFL ===
Regular season statistics
Year	Team	Games		Tackles				Interceptions						Fumbles	
Year	Team	G	GS	Comb	Solo	Ast	Sack	PD	Int	Yds	Avg	Lng	TDs	FF	FR
2018	JAX	14	8	32	24	8	1.0	3	1	14	14.0	14	0	0	0
2019	JAX	14	14	71	44	27	2.0	9	2	66	33.0	35	0	0	1
2020	CLE	11	7	38	24	14	1.0	7	1	47	47.0	47	1	0	1
2021	CLE	12	11	58	40	18	1.0	3	1	0	0	0	0	0	0
2022	CLE	16	5	24	16	8	0.5	1	0	0	0	0	0	0	0
2023	IND	7	3	20	11	9	1.0	2	2	45	22.5	36	1	0	0
2024	IND	10	0	2	2	0	0	0	0	0	0	0	0	1	0
2025	ATL	10	4	29	20	9	2.0	2	0	0	0	0	0	0	0
Total		94	52	274	181	93	8.5	27	7	172	24.6	47	2	1	2

=== College ===
Year	Team	GP	Tackles				Interceptions				
Year	Team	GP	Comb	Total	Ast	Sack	Int	Yards	Avg	TD	PD
2015	Alabama	14	17	11	6	1.0	2	41	20.5	0	6
2016	Alabama	14	83	56	27	0.0	2	64	32.0	1	7
2017	Alabama	14	74	43	31	2.5	3	7	2.3	0	4
Career		42	174	110	64	3.5	7	112	16.0	1	17
