= Mike Windt =

American football player (born 1986)

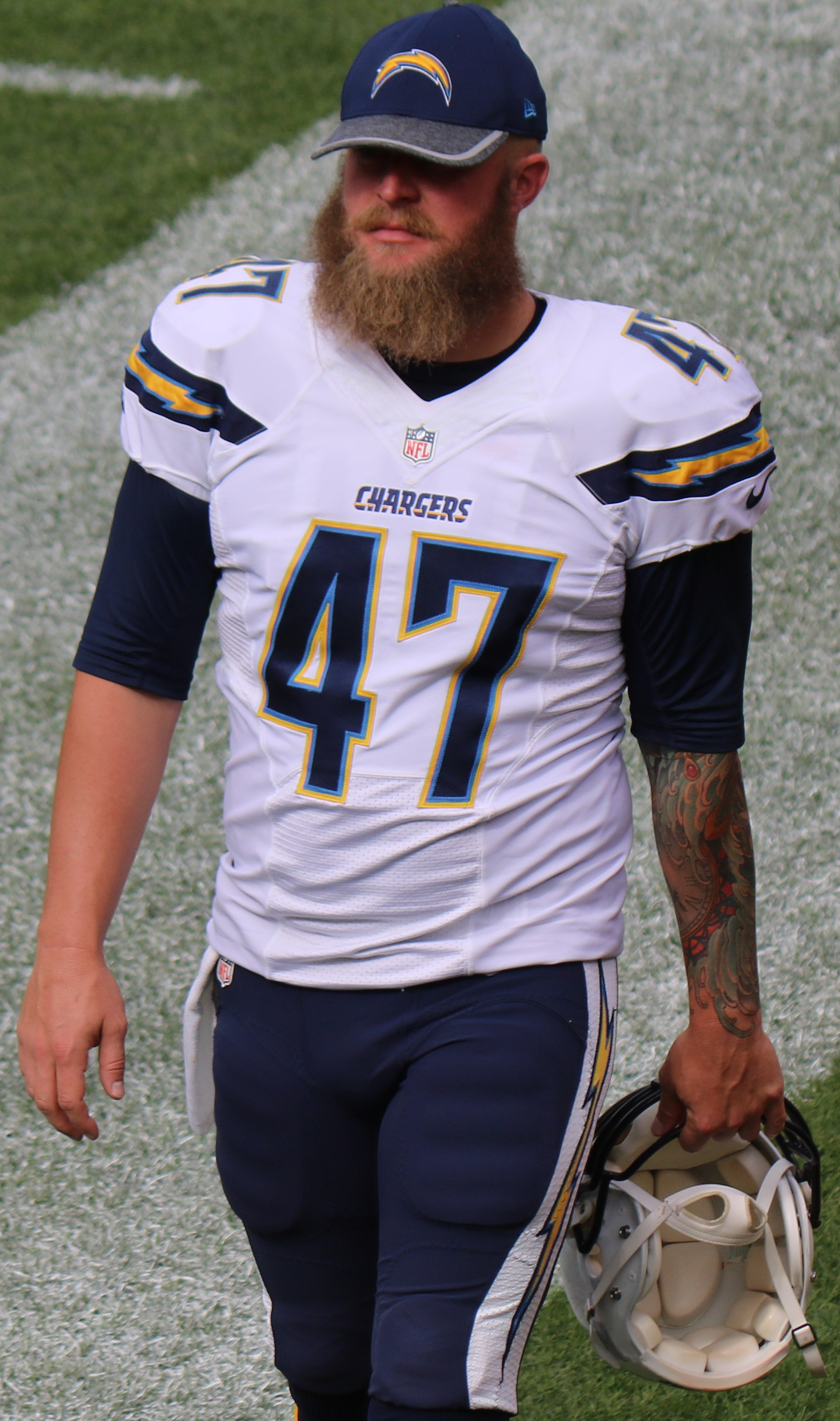
- Windt with the San Diego Chargers in 2016

No. 47
- Position: Long snapper

Personal information
- Born: May 29, 1986 (age 40); Cincinnati, Ohio, U.S.
- Listed height: 6 ft 1 in (1.85 m)
- Listed weight: 237 lb (108 kg)

Career information
- High school: Elder (Cincinnati)
- College: Cincinnati (2007–2009)
- NFL draft: 2010: undrafted

Career history
- Cincinnati Bengals (2010)*; San Diego / Los Angeles Chargers (2010–2018)
- * Offseason or practice squad member only

Career NFL statistics
- Games played: 117
- Total tackles: 13
- Fumble recoveries: 1
- Stats at Pro Football Reference

Mike Windt (born May 29, 1986) is an American former professional football player who was a long snapper in the National Football League (NFL). He played college football for the Cincinnati Bearcats.

== College career ==
Windt had an outstanding three-year career (2007–09) at the University of Cincinnati. Windt played well in 395 career snaps for the Bearcats.

== Professional career ==
=== Cincinnati Bengals ===
After going undrafted in the 2010 NFL draft, Windt signed with the Cincinnati Bengals as a rookie free agent on April 24, 2010, he was later cut before the regular season.

=== San Diego / Los Angeles Chargers ===
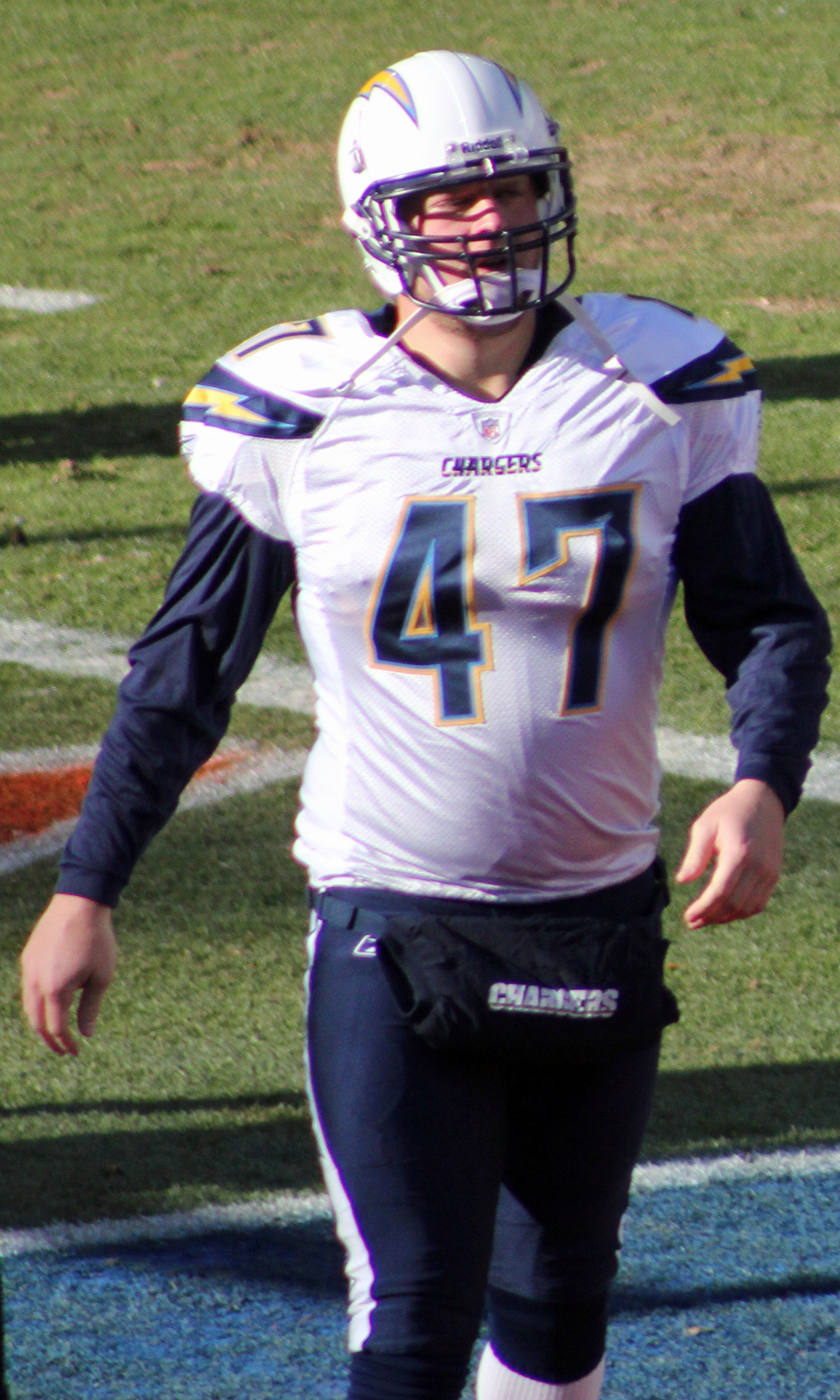
Windt with the San Diego Chargers in 2011

Windt was signed by the San Diego Chargers on October 13, 2010. Windt becomes the Chargers' long snapper in 2010. David Binn, James Dearth and Ryan Neill were all on Injured-Reserve and Ethan Albright snapped in the Chargers' last two games. Windt is arguably most famous for snapping the direct snap and participating in the blocking on the fake punt by Eric Weddle in the 2013 season finale that propelled the Chargers' winning drive that got the team into the 2013-14 postseason.

On March 8, 2017, Windt signed a four-year, $4.41 million contract extension with the Chargers.

On August 20, 2019, after playing nine consecutive seasons with the Chargers, he was released in favor of Cole Mazza who was signed that offseason.

== Personal life ==
Windt was originally born and raised in Cincinnati, Ohio. He attended Elder High School. He currently resides in San Diego, California with his wife. Windt also has an older brother and a younger sister.
