= Shyheim Carter =

American football player (born 1997)

Profile
- Position: Safety

Personal information
- Born: December 15, 1997 (age 28); Kentwood, Louisiana, U.S.
- Listed height: 5 ft 10 in (1.78 m)
- Listed weight: 194 lb (88 kg)

Career information
- High school: Kentwood (Kentwood, Louisiana)
- College: Alabama (2016–2019)
- NFL draft: 2020: undrafted

Career history

Playing
- New York Jets (2020)*; Atlanta Falcons (2020)*; Houston Texans (2021)*; Tennessee Titans (2021–2023); Birmingham Stallions (2025)
- * Offseason or practice squad member only

Coaching
- Alabama (2021) Spring graduate assistant

Career NFL statistics
- Total tackles: 3
- Stats at Pro Football Reference

Shyheim Carter (born December 15, 1997) is an American professional football safety. He played college football for the Alabama Crimson Tide and was signed by the New York Jets as an undrafted free agent in 2020. He has also been a member of the Atlanta Falcons and Houston Texans.

== Early life ==
Carter was born on December 15, 1997, in Kentwood, Louisiana. He attended Kentwood High School and played quarterback and cornerback; he was ranked a four-star recruit and was considered one of the top prospects in the state. He was first-team all-state as both a junior and senior and was selected to play in the Under Armour All-America Game. He was also the Class 1A Offensive MVP in his last two years and led Kentwood to a state championships in 2015 after having thrown for 2,443 yards, ran for 1,648 yards, and intercepted five passes. Carter was ranked by ESPN as the 40th-best player nationally, the 6th-best cornerback and 4th-best player in the state. He committed to play college football for the Alabama Crimson Tide, de-committed, and then committed to the school again.

== College career ==
As a true freshman at Alabama in 2016, Carter appeared in nine games and posted seven tackles. He later noted that when he first arrived, he thought he would never be able to learn the playbook, but by his senior year, he had become known as one of the most knowledgeable players on the team. In Carter's sophomore year, he played all 14 games and posted seven tackles with a pass breakup. Carter became a starter for the first time in the 2018 season. That year, he totaled 44 tackles, (Note: Listed in some sources as 43.) 10 pass breakups and two interceptions returned for touchdowns. In his senior year, 2019, Carter recorded 43 tackles, 2.5 TFLs, seven pass breakups and an interception. He finished his tenure at Alabama having appeared in 50 games, 23 as a starter at the STAR nickelback position, and recorded 101 tackles, 6.0 TFLs, 21 pass breakups, three interceptions and two forced fumbles.

== Professional career ==
Pre-draft measurables
Height	Weight	Arm length	Hand span	Wingspan
5 ft 10 1/2 in (1.79 m)	194 lb (88 kg)	29 5/8 in (0.75 m)	9 1/2 in (0.24 m)	5 ft 11 3/4 in (1.82 m)
All values from NFL Combine

=== New York Jets ===
After going unselected in the 2020 NFL draft, Carter was signed by the New York Jets as an undrafted free agent, being given a contract that included $72,000 guaranteed, the second-highest among the team's undrafted signings. He was placed on the reserve/COVID-19 list on July 28, and was activated on August 15. He was waived on September 5, 2020.

=== Atlanta Falcons ===
On October 20, 2020, Carter was signed to the practice squad of the Atlanta Falcons. He was waived on December 8, 2020.

=== Houston Texans ===
On May 17, 2021, Carter was signed to the Houston Texans after a minicamp tryout. He was waived on August 31 and re-signed to the practice squad the next day. He was waived on October 12, 2021.

=== Tennessee Titans ===
On December 30, 2021, Carter was signed to the Tennessee Titans practice squad. He was waived on January 4, 2022. On January 25, 2022, he was signed to a reserve/future contract. He was waived on August 22, 2022. On October 4, 2022, he rejoined the team as a member of the practice squad. He was waived on November 15, 2022. He was re-signed to the team's practice squad on January 3, 2023. Carter signed a reserve/future contract with the Titans seven days later.

Carter was released at the final roster cuts, on August 29, 2023, and re-signed to the practice squad the following day. He was elevated to the active roster for the Titans' Week 4 game against the Cincinnati Bengals and made his debut in the win, appearing on 22 combined snaps while posting a tackle. He was signed to the active roster on October 14. He was waived on October 28 and re-signed to the practice squad three days later. Following the end of the 2023 regular season, the Titans signed Carter to a reserve/future contract on January 8, 2024. He was waived on August 27.

=== Birmingham Stallions ===
On January 14, 2025, Carter signed with the Birmingham Stallions of the United Football League (UFL).

=== Columbus Aviators ===
On January 13, 2026, Carter was selected by the Columbus Aviators in the 2026 UFL Draft.

== Coaching career ==
Prior to being signed by the Texans in 2021, Carter worked as a graduate assistant for Alabama.
