= Cole Mazza =

American football player (born 1995)

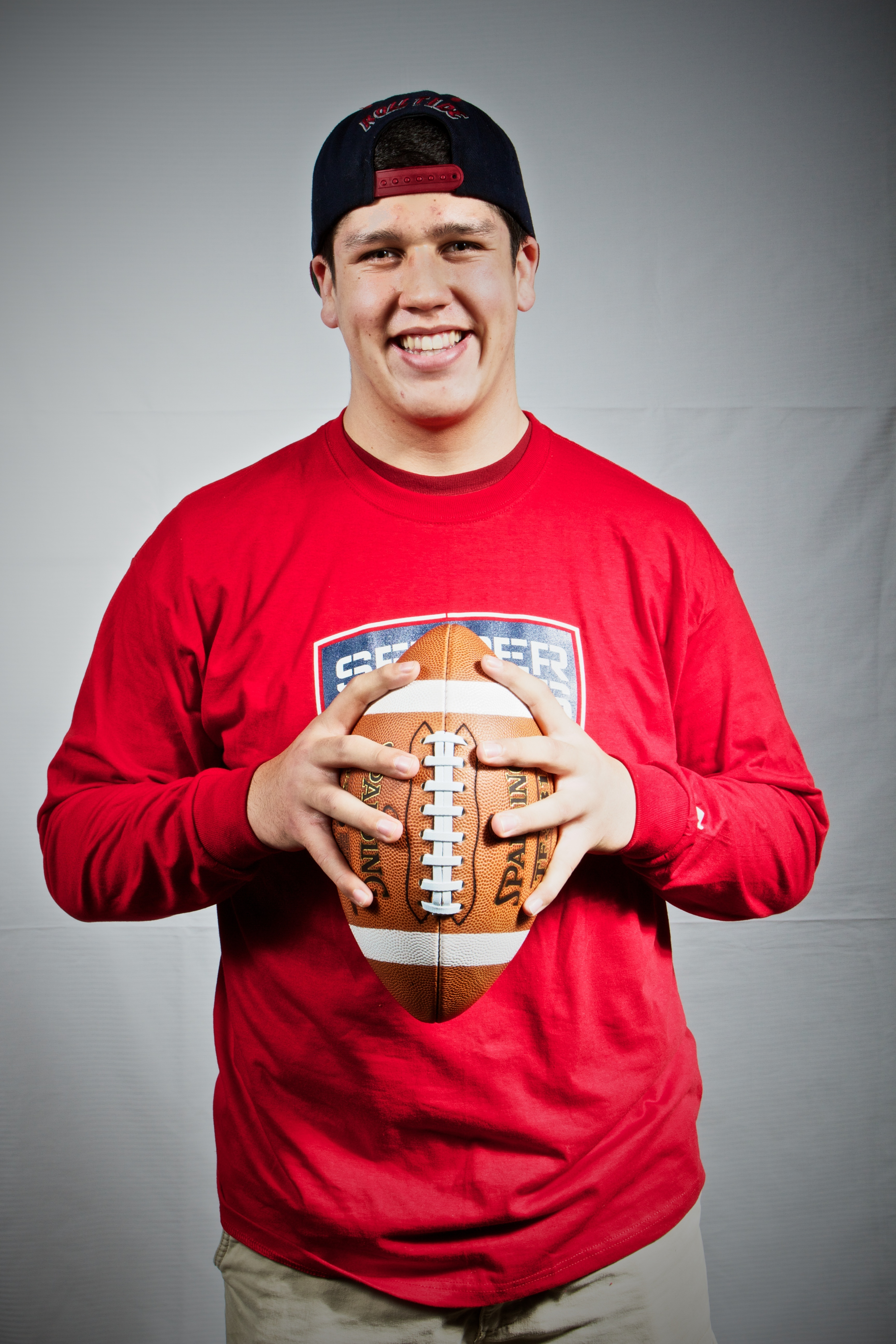
- Mazza in 2012

Profile
- Position: Long snapper

Personal information
- Born: February 14, 1995 (age 31); Bakersfield, California, U.S.
- Listed height: 6 ft 1 in (1.85 m)
- Listed weight: 247 lb (112 kg)

Career information
- High school: Liberty (Bakersfield)
- College: Alabama
- NFL draft: 2017: undrafted

Career history
- Birmingham Iron (2019); Los Angeles Chargers (2019–2020); Houston Gamblers (2023)*
- * Offseason or practice squad member only

Awards and highlights
- CFP national champion (2015)

Career NFL statistics
- Games played: 32
- Total tackles: 5
- Stats at Pro Football Reference

Cole Joseph Frank Mazza (born February 14, 1995) is an American professional football long snapper. He played college football at Alabama, and played in the National Football League (NFL) for the Los Angeles Chargers.

== College career ==
Mazza was served as the starting long snapper Alabama Crimson Tide for four seasons, including the team's 2015 National Championship year. He missed only two games in four years due to injury and finished his collegiate career without a single botched snap in 583 attempts. Following his senior season Mazza was invited to participate in the 2017 Senior Bowl.

== Professional career ==
Mazza worked for two years as a fitness coach at Orangetheory Fitness after graduating from Alabama with a degree in kinesiology.

=== Birmingham Iron ===
Mazza was signed by the Birmingham Iron of the Alliance of American Football. He served as the long snapper in all eight of the team's games before the league folded.

=== Los Angeles Chargers ===
Mazza was signed by the Los Angeles Chargers on April 8, 2019. Mazza beat out nine year incumbent Mike Windt to become the Chargers' long snapper for the regular season. Mazza made his NFL debut on September 8 against the Indianapolis Colts. Mazza served as the Chargers' long snapper for all 16 games in his first NFL season.

On August 30, 2021, Mazza was waived/injured by the Chargers and placed on injured reserve. He was released by the Chargers on September 8.

=== Houston Gamblers ===
On January 19, 2023, Mazza signed with the Houston Gamblers of the United States Football League (USFL). On April 10, Mazza was released by the Gamblers.
