= Akeem Judd =

American football player (born 1992)

No. 38, 37, 36
- Position: Running back

Personal information
- Born: December 11, 1992 (age 33); Durham, North Carolina
- Listed height: 5 ft 10 in (1.78 m)
- Listed weight: 225 lb (102 kg)

Career information
- High school: Southern (Durham, North Carolina)
- College: Georgia Military, Ole Miss
- NFL draft: 2017: undrafted

Career history
- Tennessee Titans (2017); New York Jets (2017); Green Bay Packers (2018)*
- * Offseason or practice squad member only
- Stats at Pro Football Reference

Akeem Judd (born December 11, 1992) is an American former football running back. He played college football at Ole Miss. He was signed by the Tennessee Titans as an undrafted free agent in 2017 and also spent time with the New York Jets and Green Bay Packers before announcing his retirement in August 2018.

== Professional career ==
=== Tennessee Titans ===
Judd signed with the Tennessee Titans as an undrafted free agent on May 11, 2017. He was waived/injured by the Titans on September 2, 2017 with a thumb injury and was placed on injured reserve. He was released with an injury settlement on October 10, 2017.

=== New York Jets ===
On October 24, 2017, Judd was signed to the New York Jets' practice squad. He was promoted to the active roster on December 12, 2017. He was placed on injured reserve on December 30, 2017. He was waived by the Jets on May 4, 2018.

=== Green Bay Packers ===
On August 6, 2018, Judd was signed by the Green Bay Packers. He was placed on reserve/retired list on August 18, 2018.

Akeem has two sons. Akeem Judd Jr. and Karon Judd
