= Adam Griffith (American football) =

Polish-born American football player (born 1993)

No. 99
- Position: Placekicker

Personal information
- Born: 1993 (age 32–33); Poland
- Listed height: 5 ft 10 in (1.78 m)
- Listed weight: 191 lb (87 kg)

Career information
- High school: Calhoun High School
- College: Alabama (2012–2016)

Awards and highlights
- CFP national champion (2015); Second-team All-SEC (2015)
- Stats at ESPN

Adam Griffith (born Andrzej Dębowski, 1993) is a former American football placekicker for the University of Alabama Crimson Tide. He played college football at Alabama, helping his team earn two National Championships and four SEC Championships. He was inducted into the Calhoun High School hall of fame.

== College career ==
At Alabama, he was the all-time leader for extra point kicks with 186. He is fifth all-time with 57 field goals.

=== 2013 season ===
On November 30, 2013, Griffith's kick to win the Iron Bowl came up short from 57 yards out, allowing Auburn returner Chris Davis to bring the kick back 109 yards for the game winning touchdown, later becoming known as the Kick Six.

=== 2014 season ===
On November 8, 2014, Griffith hit a game-tying field goal against LSU on the last play of the 4th quarter. Alabama won in overtime 20–13.

=== 2015 season ===
On November 7, 2015, Griffith made a career-long 55-yard field goal against LSU. On November 28, 2015, Griffith made five field goals against Auburn in a 29–13 win. On January 11, 2016, Griffith perfectly placed an onside kick in the National Championship game against Clemson helping the Crimson Tide achieve a 45–40 victory.

== Personal life ==
Griffith was born Andrzej Dębowski and he grew up in an orphanage in Poland. When he was 13 he was adopted and moved to Georgia. He was adopted by two teachers, Tom and Michelle Griffith. He was one of seven children in the Dębowski family. The substance abuse issues of his parents forced the Polish courts to take all of the children away.

== See also ==
- List of orphans
