= List of Rose Bowl Game broadcasters =

The Rose Bowl was first televised in 1947 on W6XYZ, an experimental station out of Los Angeles that would eventually become KTLA.

== Television ==
=== ESPN years (2011–present) ===
Beginning with the 2010 season, ESPN (majority-owned by ABC's parent company, The Walt Disney Company) now broadcasts all the BCS/CFP games, including the Rose Bowl game. The game is also broadcast nationally by ESPN Radio and by ESPN International for Latin America. In 2013, ESPN Deportes provided the first Spanish language telecast in the U.S. of the Rose Bowl Game.

The Rose Bowl game contract with ESPN was extended on June 28, 2012, to 2026, for a reportedly $80 million per year.

Date	Network	Play-by-play	Color commentator(s)	Sideline reporter(s)
January 1, 2026	ESPN	Chris Fowler	Kirk Herbstreit	Holly Rowe and Kris Budden
January 1, 2025	ESPN	Chris Fowler	Kirk Herbstreit	Holly Rowe and Stormy Buonantony
January 1, 2024	ESPN	Chris Fowler	Kirk Herbstreit	Holly Rowe and Laura Rutledge
January 2, 2023	ESPN	Chris Fowler	Kirk Herbstreit	Holly Rowe
January 1, 2022	ESPN	Chris Fowler	Kirk Herbstreit	Holly Rowe and Tiffany Blackmon
January 1, 2021	ESPN	Sean McDonough	Todd Blackledge	Todd McShay and Allison Williams
January 1, 2020	ESPN	Chris Fowler	Kirk Herbstreit	Maria Taylor and Tom Rinaldi
January 1, 2019	ESPN	Chris Fowler	Kirk Herbstreit	Maria Taylor and Tom Rinaldi
January 1, 2018	ESPN	Chris Fowler	Kirk Herbstreit	Maria Taylor and Tom Rinaldi
January 2, 2017	ESPN	Chris Fowler	Kirk Herbstreit	Samantha Ponder and Tom Rinaldi
January 1, 2016	ESPN	Brent Musburger	Jesse Palmer	Maria Taylor
January 1, 2015	ESPN	Chris Fowler	Kirk Herbstreit	Heather Cox and Tom Rinaldi
January 1, 2014	ESPN	Brent Musburger	Kirk Herbstreit	Heather Cox and Tom Rinaldi
January 1, 2013	ESPN	Brent Musburger	Kirk Herbstreit	Heather Cox and Tom Rinaldi
January 2, 2012	ESPN	Brent Musburger	Kirk Herbstreit	Erin Andrews
January 1, 2011	ESPN	Brent Musburger	Kirk Herbstreit	Erin Andrews

=== ABC years (1989–2010) ===
From 1989 to 2010, the game was broadcast on ABC, usually at 2 p.m. PST; the 2005 edition was the first one broadcast in HDTV. The first 9-year contract in 1988 started at about $11 million, which is what NBC had been paying. The 2002 Rose Bowl was the first broadcast not set at the traditional 2:00pm West Coast time. Beginning in 2007, FOX had the broadcast rights to the other Bowl Championship Series games, but the Rose Bowl, which negotiates its own television contract independent of the BCS, had agreed to keep the game on ABC.

Date	Network	Play-by-play	Color commentator(s)	Sideline reporter(s)
January 1, 2010	ABC	Brent Musburger	Kirk Herbstreit	Lisa Salters
January 1, 2009	ABC	Brent Musburger	Kirk Herbstreit	Lisa Salters
January 1, 2008	ABC	Brent Musburger	Kirk Herbstreit	Lisa Salters
January 1, 2007	ABC	Brent Musburger	Bob Davie and Kirk Herbstreit	Lisa Salters
January 4, 2006	ABC	Keith Jackson	Dan Fouts	Todd Harris and Holly Rowe
January 1, 2005	ABC	Keith Jackson	Dan Fouts	Todd Harris
January 1, 2004	ABC	Keith Jackson	Dan Fouts	Todd Harris
January 1, 2003	ABC	Brent Musburger	Gary Danielson	Jack Arute
January 3, 2002	ABC	Keith Jackson	Tim Brant	Todd Harris and Lynn Swann
January 1, 2001	ABC	Keith Jackson	Tim Brant	Todd Harris
January 1, 2000	ABC	Keith Jackson	Dan Fouts	Todd Harris
January 1, 1999	ABC	Keith Jackson	Bob Griese	Lynn Swann
January 1, 1998	ABC	Keith Jackson	Bob Griese	Lynn Swann
January 1, 1997	ABC	Brent Musburger	Dick Vermeil	Jack Arute
January 1, 1996	ABC	Keith Jackson	Bob Griese	Lynn Swann
January 2, 1995	ABC	Keith Jackson	Bob Griese	Lynn Swann
January 1, 1994	ABC	Keith Jackson	Bob Griese	Lynn Swann
January 1, 1993	ABC	Brent Musburger	Dick Vermeil	
January 1, 1992	ABC	Keith Jackson	Bob Griese	
January 1, 1991	ABC	Keith Jackson	Bob Griese	
January 1, 1990	ABC	Keith Jackson	Bob Griese	Mike Adamle and Jack Arute
January 2, 1989	ABC	Keith Jackson	Bob Griese	Mike Adamle

=== NBC years (1952–88) ===
The 1952 Rose Bowl, on NBC, was the first national telecast of a college football game. The network broadcast both the Tournament of Roses Parade and the following game. The 1956 Rose Bowl has the highest TV rating of all college bowl games, watched by 41.1% of all people in the US with TV sets. The 1962 game was the first college football game broadcast in color. Television ratings for the Rose Bowl declined as the number of bowl games increased. The other bowl games also provided more compelling match-ups, with higher-ranked teams. In 1988, NBC gave up the broadcast rights, as the television share dropped in 1987 below 20.

Date	Network	Play-by-play	Color commentator(s)	Sideline reporter(s)
January 1, 1988	NBC	Dick Enberg	Merlin Olsen	
January 1, 1987	NBC	Dick Enberg	Merlin Olsen	
January 1, 1986	NBC	Dick Enberg	Merlin Olsen	
January 1, 1985	NBC	Dick Enberg	Merlin Olsen	
January 2, 1984	NBC	Dick Enberg	Merlin Olsen	
January 1, 1983	NBC	Dick Enberg	Merlin Olsen	
January 1, 1982	NBC	Dick Enberg	Merlin Olsen	
January 1, 1981	NBC	Dick Enberg	Merlin Olsen	
January 1, 1980	NBC	Dick Enberg	Merlin Olsen	O. J. Simpson
January 1, 1979	NBC	Curt Gowdy	John Brodie and O. J. Simpson	None
January 2, 1978	NBC	Curt Gowdy	John Brodie	None
January 1, 1977	NBC	Curt Gowdy	Don Meredith	None
January 1, 1976	NBC	Curt Gowdy	Al DeRogatis	Ross Porter
January 1, 1975	NBC	Curt Gowdy	Al DeRogatis	Ross Porter
January 1, 1974	NBC	Curt Gowdy	Al DeRogatis	Al DeRogatis
January 1, 1973	NBC	Curt Gowdy	Al DeRogatis	Al DeRogatis
January 1, 1972	NBC	Curt Gowdy	Al DeRogatis	Al DeRogatis
January 1, 1971	NBC	Curt Gowdy	Kyle Rote	None
January 1, 1970	NBC	Curt Gowdy	Kyle Rote	None
January 1, 1969	NBC	Curt Gowdy	Kyle Rote	None
January 1, 1968	NBC	Curt Gowdy	Paul Christman	None
January 2, 1967	NBC	Lindsey Nelson	Terry Brennan	None
January 1, 1966	NBC	Lindsey Nelson	Terry Brennan	None
January 1, 1965	NBC	Lindsey Nelson	Ray Scott	None
January 1, 1964	NBC	Lindsey Nelson	Terry Brennan	None
January 1, 1963	NBC	Mel Allen	Bill Symes	None
January 1, 1962	NBC	Mel Allen	Braven Dyer	None
January 2, 1961	NBC	Mel Allen	Chick Hearn	None
January 1, 1960	NBC	Mel Allen	Lee Giroux	None
January 1, 1959	NBC	Mel Allen	Chick Hearn	None
January 1, 1958	NBC	Mel Allen	Chick Hearn	None
January 1, 1957	NBC	Mel Allen	Lee Giroux	None
January 2, 1956	NBC	Mel Allen	Sam Balter	None
January 1, 1955	NBC	Mel Allen	Dick Danehe	None
January 1, 1954	NBC	Mel Allen	Tom Harmon	None
January 1, 1953	NBC	Mel Allen	Tom Harmon	None
January 1, 1952	NBC	Mel Allen	Jack Brickhouse	None

== Radio ==
Date	Network	Play-by-play	Color commentator(s)	Sideline reporter(s)
January 1, 2024	ESPN Radio	Joe Tessitore	Dusty Dvoracek	Quint Kessenich
January 2, 2023	ESPN Radio	Marc Kestecher	Kelly Stouffer	Ian Fitzsimmons
January 1, 2022	ESPN Radio	Tom Hart	Jordan Rodgers	Cole Cubelic
January 1, 2021	ESPN Radio	Joe Tessitore	Andre Ware	Holly Rowe
January 1, 2020	ESPN Radio	Bob Wischusen	Dan Orlovsky	Allison Williams
January 1, 2019	ESPN Radio	Dave Pasch	Greg McElroy	Tom Luginbill
January 1, 2018	ESPN Radio	Steve Levy	Brian Griese	Todd McShay
January 2, 2017	ESPN Radio	Dave Pasch	Greg McElroy	Molly McGrath
January 1, 2016	ESPN Radio	Dave Pasch	Brian Griese	Tom Rinaldi
January 1, 2015	ESPN Radio	Sean McDonough	Chris Spielman	Todd McShay
January 1, 2014	ESPN Radio	Bill Rosinski	David Norrie	Joe Schad
January 1, 2013	ESPN Radio	Dave Pasch	Brian Griese	Jenn Brown
January 2, 2012	ESPN Radio	Dave Pasch	Chris Spielman	Tom Rinaldi
January 1, 2011	ESPN Radio	Bill Rosinski	David Norrie	Joe Schad
January 1, 2010	ESPN Radio	Mike Tirico	Jon Gruden	Shelley Smith
January 1, 2009	ESPN Radio	Mike Tirico	David Norrie	Erin Andrews
January 1, 2008	ESPN Radio	Dave Barnett	Rod Gilmore	Erin Andrews
January 1, 2007	ESPN Radio	Sean McDonough	Chris Spielman	Todd Harris
January 4, 2006	ESPN Radio	Ron Franklin	Bob Davie	Dave Ryan
January 1, 2005	ESPN Radio	Sean McDonough	Rod Gilmore	none used
January 1, 2004	ESPN Radio	Mike Tirico	Chris Spielman	Matt Winer
January 1, 2003	ESPN Radio	Steve Levy	Rod Gilmore	Alex Flanagan
January 3, 2002	ESPN Radio	Ron Franklin	Mike Gottfried	Adrian Karsten
January 1, 2001	ESPN Radio	Charley Steiner	Bill Curry	Holly Rowe
January 1, 2000	ESPN Radio	Charley Steiner	Rod Gilmore	Rob Stone
January 1, 1999	ESPN Radio	Charley Steiner	Todd Christensen	Holly Rowe
January 1, 1998	ESPN Radio	Charley Steiner	Todd Christensen	none used
January 1, 1997	NBC Radio	Joel Meyers	Jack Snow	none used
January 1, 1996	NBC Radio	Joel Meyers	Jack Snow	none used
January 2, 1995	NBC Radio	Joel Meyers	Jack Snow	none used
January 1, 1994	NBC Radio	Joel Meyers	Jack Snow	none used
January 1, 1993	NBC Radio	Joel Meyers	Jack Snow	none used
January 1, 1992	NBC Radio	Joel Meyers	Jack Snow	none used
January 1, 1991	NBC Radio	Wayne Larrivee	Jack Snow	none used
January 1, 1990	NBC Radio	Joel Meyers	Jack Snow	none used
January 2, 1989	NBC Radio	Mel Proctor	Jack Snow	none used
January 1, 1988	NBC Radio	Marty Glickman	Stan White	none used
January 1, 1987	NBC Radio	Marty Glickman	Jack O'Rourke	none used
January 1, 1986	NBC Radio	Marty Glickman	Jack O'Rourke	none used
January 1, 1985	NBC Radio	Marty Glickman	Jack O'Rourke	none used
January 2, 1984	NBC Radio	Bob Costas	Jack O'Rourke	none used
January 1, 1983	NBC Radio	Jack O'Rourke	Rick Forzano	none used
January 1, 1982	NBC Radio	Jack O'Rourke	Rick Forzano	none used
January 1, 1981	NBC Radio	Jack O'Rourke	Rick Forzano	none used
January 1, 1980	NBC Radio	Bob Buck	Rick Forzano	none used
January 1, 1979	NBC Radio	Tom Kelly	Bob Ufer*	none used
January 2, 1978	NBC Radio	Barry Tompkins	Bob Ufer*	none used
January 1, 1977	NBC Radio	Tom Kelly	Bob Ufer*	none used
January 1, 1976	NBC Radio	Marv Homan	Fred Hessler*	none used
January 1, 1975	NBC Radio	Tom Kelly	Tom Hamlin*	none used
January 1, 1974	NBC Radio	Tom Kelly	Tom Hamlin*	none used
January 1, 1973	NBC Radio	Tom Kelly	Marv Homan*	none used
January 1, 1972	NBC Radio	Don Klein	Don Kramer*	none used
January 1, 1971	NBC Radio	Don Klein	Marv Homan*	none used
January 1, 1970	NBC Radio	Mike Walden	Don Kramer*	none used
January 1, 1969	NBC Radio	Mike Walden	Marv Homan*	none used
January 1, 1968	NBC Radio	Mike Walden	Hilliard Gates*	none used
January 2, 1967	NBC Radio	Mike Walden	Hilliard Gates*	none used
January 1, 1966	NBC Radio	Fred Hessler	Bob Reynolds*	none used
January 1, 1965	NBC Radio	Bob Ufer	Bob Blackburn*	none used
January 1, 1964	NBC Radio	Bob Wolff	Larry Stewart*	none used
January 1, 1963	NBC Radio	Tom Kelly	Mike Walden*	none used
January 1, 1962	NBC Radio	Fred Hessler	Chick Hearn*	none used
January 2, 1961	NBC Radio	Curt Gowdy	Braven Dyer	none used
January 1, 1960	NBC Radio	Chick Hearn	Braven Dyer	none used
January 1, 1959	NBC Radio	Bud Foster	Braven Dyer	none used
January 1, 1958	NBC Radio	Al Helfer	Keith Jackson	none used
January 1, 1957	NBC Radio	Al Helfer	Braven Dyer	none used
January 2, 1956	NBC Radio	Al Helfer	Braven Dyer	none used
January 1, 1955	NBC Radio	Al Helfer	Braven Dyer	none used
January 1, 1954	NBC Radio	Al Helfer	Braven Dyer	none used
January 1, 1953	NBC Radio	Al Helfer	Braven Dyer	none used
January 1, 1952	NBC Radio	Al Helfer	Braven Dyer	none used
January 1, 1951	CBS Radio	Red Barber	Connie Desmond	none used
January 2, 1950	CBS Radio	Red Barber	Connie Desmond	none used
January 1, 1949	CBS Radio	Mel Allen	John Herrington	none used
January 1, 1948	NBC Radio	Bill Stern	none used	none used
January 1, 1947	NBC Radio	Bill Stern	none used	none used
January 1, 1946	NBC Radio	Bill Stern	none used	none used
January 1, 1945	NBC Radio	Bill Stern	none used	none used
January 1, 1944	NBC Radio	Bill Stern	Ken Carpenter	none used
January 1, 1943	NBC Radio	Bill Stern	Ken Carpenter	none used
January 1, 1942	NBC Radio	Bill Stern	Ken Carpenter	none used
January 1, 1941	NBC Radio	Bill Stern	Ken Carpenter	none used
January 1, 1940	NBC Radio	Bill Stern	Ken Carpenter	none used
January 2, 1939	NBC Radio	Bill Stern	Ken Carpenter	none used
January 1, 1938	NBC Radio	Ronald Reagan	Ken Carpenter	none used
January 1, 1937	NBC Radio	Don Wilson	Ken Carpenter	none used
January 1, 1936	NBC Radio	Don Wilson	Ken Carpenter	none used
January 1, 1935	NBC Radio	Don Wilson	Ken Carpenter	none used
January 1, 1934	NBC Radio	Graham McNamee	Carl Haverlin	none used
January 2, 1933	NBC Radio	Don Wilson	Ken Carpenter	none used
January 1, 1932	NBC Radio	Graham McNamee	Carl Haverlin	none used
January 1, 1931	NBC Radio	Graham McNamee	Carl Haverlin	none used
January 1, 1930	NBC Radio	Lloyd Yoder	Carl Haverlin	none used
January 1, 1929	NBC Radio	Bill Munday	Carl Haverlin	none used
January 2, 1928	NBC Radio	Graham McNamee	Carl Haverlin	none used
January 1, 1927	NBC Radio	Graham McNamee	Carl Haverlin	none used

=== Notes ===
- From 1962-1978, inclusive, NBC used the primary play-by-play voice for each school to call one half of the game while the other man did color analysis. At halftime, the two would switch roles. Where a team is listed in the color commentator column, we are trying to ascertain the name of the man who was the primary voice for that team for that year.

== See also ==
- Sports broadcasting contracts in the United States § College football
- Bowl Championship Series on television and radio
