= List of Orange Bowl broadcasters =

Television network, play-by-play and color commentator for the Orange Bowl from 1953 to the present.

== Television ==
ESPN televised the Orange Bowl game from 2011–2014, as part of the cable network's $500 million broadcast deal with the BCS. ESPN will continue to televise the Orange Bowl through December 31, 2025 as part of its broadcast deal with the College Football Playoff. The Orange Bowl and Fiesta Bowl are the only two bowl games ever to air on all the "big 4" broadcast television networks in the United States (ABC, CBS, NBC and Fox).

Date	Network	Play-by-play	Color commentator(s)	Sideline reporter(s)
January 1, 2026	ESPN	Joe Tessitore	Jesse Palmer	Katie George and Stormy Buonantony
January 9, 2025	ESPN	Sean McDonough	Greg McElroy	Molly McGrath and Katie George
December 30, 2023	ESPN	Joe Tessitore	Jesse Palmer	Katie George
December 30, 2022	ESPN	Joe Tessitore	Greg McElroy	Katie George
December 31, 2021	ESPN	Chris Fowler	Kirk Herbstreit	Holly Rowe and Marty Smith
January 2, 2021	ESPN	Bob Wischusen	Dan Orlovsky	Katie George
December 30, 2019	ESPN	Steve Levy	Brian Griese	Todd McShay and Molly McGrath
December 29, 2018	ESPN	Chris Fowler	Kirk Herbstreit	Maria Taylor and Laura Rutledge
December 30, 2017	ESPN	Steve Levy	Brian Griese	Todd McShay and Molly McGrath
December 30, 2016	ESPN	Steve Levy	Brian Griese	Todd McShay
December 31, 2015	ESPN	Brad Nessler	Todd Blackledge	Holly Rowe
December 31, 2014	ESPN	Brent Musburger	Jesse Palmer	Maria Taylor
January 3, 2014	ESPN	Joe Tessitore	Matt Millen	Maria Taylor
January 1, 2013	ESPN	Joe Tessitore	Matt Millen	Maria Taylor
January 4, 2012	ESPN	Mike Tirico	Ron Jaworski and Jon Gruden	Lisa Salters
January 3, 2011	ESPN	Mike Tirico	Ron Jaworski and Jon Gruden	Michele Tafoya
January 5, 2010	Fox	Dick Stockton	Charles Davis	Chris Myers and Laura Okmin
January 1, 2009	Fox	Thom Brennaman	Charles Davis	Chris Myers
January 3, 2008	Fox	Kenny Albert	Daryl Johnston and Barry Alvarez	Jeanne Zelasko
January 2, 2007	Fox	Matt Vasgersian	Terry Donahue and Pat Haden	Laura Okmin
January 3, 2006	ABC	Mike Tirico	Kirk Herbstreit	Erin Andrews
January 4, 2005	ABC	Brad Nessler	Bob Griese	Lynn Swann and Todd Harris
January 1, 2004	ABC	Brad Nessler	Bob Griese	Lynn Swann
January 2, 2003	ABC	Tim Brant	Ed Cunningham	Sam Ryan
January 2, 2002	ABC	Brad Nessler	Bob Griese	Lynn Swann
January 3, 2001	ABC	Brad Nessler	Bob Griese	Lynn Swann and Jack Arute
January 1, 2000	ABC	Brad Nessler	Bob Griese	Lynn Swann
January 2, 1999	ABC	Brad Nessler	Gary Danielson	Dean Blevins
January 2, 1998	CBS	Sean McDonough	Terry Donahue	
December 31, 1996	CBS	Sean McDonough	Mike Mayock	Dave Logan
January 1, 1996	CBS	Sean McDonough	Pat Haden	
January 1, 1995	NBC	Tom Hammond	Cris Collinsworth	John Dockery
January 1, 1994	NBC	Dick Enberg	Bob Trumpy	O. J. Simpson
January 1, 1993	NBC	Don Criqui	Bob Trumpy	John Dockery
January 1, 1992	NBC	Dick Enberg	Bill Walsh	John Dockery
January 1, 1991	NBC	Dick Enberg	Bill Walsh	O. J. Simpson and Bob Trumpy
January 1, 1990	NBC	Dick Enberg	Bill Walsh	
January 2, 1989	NBC	Don Criqui	Bob Trumpy	Jim Gray
January 1, 1988	NBC	Don Criqui	Bob Trumpy	Tom Hammond
January 1, 1987	NBC	Don Criqui	Bob Trumpy	Paul Maguire
January 1, 1986	NBC	Don Criqui	Bob Trumpy and Bob Griese	Jimmy Cefalo
January 1, 1985	NBC	Don Criqui	Bob Trumpy	Bill Macatee
January 2, 1984	NBC	Don Criqui	John Brodie	Bill Macatee
January 1, 1983	NBC	Don Criqui	John Brodie	
January 1, 1982	NBC	Don Criqui	John Brodie	Bob Trumpy
January 1, 1981	NBC	Don Criqui	John Brodie	Bob Trumpy
January 1, 1980	NBC	Don Criqui	John Brodie	Bob Trumpy
January 1, 1979	NBC	Dick Enberg	Merlin Olsen	
January 2, 1978	NBC	Jim Simpson	Merlin Olsen	
January 1, 1977	NBC	Jim Simpson	John Brodie	
January 1, 1976	NBC	Jim Simpson	John Brodie	
January 1, 1975	NBC	Jim Simpson	John Brodie	
January 1, 1974	NBC	Jim Simpson	Kyle Rote	
January 1, 1973	NBC	Jim Simpson	Kyle Rote	
January 1, 1972	NBC	Jim Simpson	Kyle Rote	Bill Enis
January 1, 1971	NBC	Jim Simpson	Al DeRogatis	
January 1, 1970	NBC	Jim Simpson	Al DeRogatis	
January 1, 1969	NBC	Jim Simpson	Al DeRogatis	
January 1, 1968	NBC	Jim Simpson	Kyle Rote	
January 2, 1967	NBC	Curt Gowdy	Paul Christman	
January 1, 1966	NBC	Curt Gowdy	Paul Christman	
January 1, 1965	NBC	Jim Simpson	Bud Wilkinson	
January 1, 1964	ABC	Curt Gowdy	Paul Christman	Jim McKay
January 1, 1963	ABC	Curt Gowdy	Paul Christman	Jim McKay
January 1, 1962	ABC	Curt Gowdy	Paul Christman	Jim Simpson
January 2, 1961	CBS	Ray Scott	Paul Christman	
January 1, 1960	CBS	Joe Boland	Paul Christman	
January 1, 1959	CBS	Joe Boland	Jim McKay	
January 1, 1958	CBS	Chris Schenkel	Johnny Lujack	
January 1, 1957	CBS	Tom Harmon		
January 2, 1956	CBS	Tom Harmon	Chris Schenkel	
January 1, 1955	CBS	Bob Neal		
January 1, 1954	CBS	Red Barber		
January 1, 1953	CBS	Red Barber		

=== Notes ===
- In 2011, ESPN televised all BCS championship games from January 2011 through January 2014. This was the most prominent sports championship not shown on broadcast television. The 2011 BCS championship was the most watched program in the history of cable television, with 27.3 million viewers in 17.7 million households.
- In 2007, ABC and Fox showed one game each on January 1, Fox then showed one game each on January 2 and 3 and came back with the championship game on January 8. A similar schedule is planned for future years.
- Starting with the 2006 season, coverage would be split between ABC and Fox. Fox paid for each bowl game US$20 million. Four of the BCS bowl games were on FOX: the Orange Bowl, Sugar Bowl, Fiesta Bowl, and a new fifth game, the BCS National Championship Game. ABC will continue to broadcast the Rose Bowl Game. ABC had a $300 million eight-year contract that extends to 2014 for the broadcast rights for the Rose Bowl.
  - Fox showed all BCS championship games the first three years of the contract, while in 2010 the Rose Bowl stadium was the location of the BCS Championship game, and ABC televised it.
- When the Bowl Championship Series was formed in 1998, television coverage was consolidated on the ABC Television Network. Beginning with the 2006 season, the Fox Broadcasting Company took over television coverage of the Sugar Bowl, Orange Bowl, and Fiesta Bowl games. ABC retained the Rose Bowl game under a separate contract.
  - From 1999 to 2006 (1998–2005 seasons), all games of the BCS were televised by ABC Sports. Generally, coverage consisted of two games on New Year's Day, one on January 2, and one on either January 3 or 4. ABC paid nearly $25 million per year for the broadcast rights to the Fiesta, Sugar and Orange bowls during that time. Overall, the contract was worth $550 million over the eight years for all the bowl games.
- During coverage of the final quarter of the 1992 game, two power feeder cables that were originating coverage into NBC's main production truck accidentally caught itself on fire, forcing all 12 cameras and all NBC stations to knock off the air with an identification slide for 18 seconds. After the video portion returned, NBC was forced to switch to a scrambled Japanese feed of the game off of JOTX, with Japanese audio for 30 seconds before silencing their audio portions with a voiceover, "Ladies and Gentlemen, we are experiencing technical difficulties. Please stand by". A teletext was then shown afterwards, "Sorry for the inconvenience, we have been experiencing transmission difficulties due to atmospheric conditions". While the teletext remained on screen, NBC Sports announcers Gayle Gardner and Paul McGuire then returned back on air with an announcement before describing an action between both teams from NBC's studios in New York. 14 minutes later, Dick Enberg apologized to its viewers that a major power failure has knocked out their cameras. At that point, NBC was forced to borrow one camera from Japanese network JOTX for parts of the game.

=== Spanish ===
In 2013, ESPN Deportes will provide the first Spanish U.S. telecast of the Orange Bowl.

Date	Network	Play-by-play	Color commentator(s)
January 1, 2013	ESPN Deportes	Eduardo Varela	Pablo Viruega

== Radio ==
Date	Network	Play-by-play	Color commentator	Sideline reporters
December 30, 2023	ESPN Radio	Dave Flemming	Brock Osweiler	Kayla Burton
December 30, 2022	ESPN Radio	Mike Couzens	Max Starks	Paul Carcaterra
December 31, 2021	ESPN Radio	Mark Jones	Robert Griffin III	Quint Kessenich
January 2, 2021	ESPN Radio	Sean Kelley	Barrett Jones	
December 30, 2019	ESPN Radio	Sean Kelley	Barrett Jones	Ian Fitzsimmons
December 29, 2018	ESPN Radio	Steve Levy	Brian Griese	Todd McShay
December 30, 2017	ESPN Radio	Dave Flemming	Anthony Becht	Rocky Boiman
December 30, 2016	ESPN Radio	Dave Flemming	Tom Ramsey	Allison Williams
December 31, 2015	ESPN Radio	Bill Rosinski	David Norrie	Joe Schad
December 31, 2014	ESPN Radio	Bill Rosinski	David Norrie	Joe Schad
January 3, 2014	ESPN Radio	Sean McDonough	Chris Spielman	Shannon Spake
January 1, 2013	ESPN Radio	Bill Rosinski	David Norrie	Joe Schad
January 4, 2012	ESPN Radio	Joe Tessitore	Rod Gilmore	Quint Kessenich
January 3, 2011	ESPN Radio	Bill Rosinski	David Norrie	Joe Schad
January 5, 2010	ESPN Radio	Sean McDonough	Matt Millen	Holly Rowe
January 1, 2009	ESPN Radio	Ron Franklin	Ed Cunningham	Jack Arute
January 6, 2006	ESPN Radio	Gary Thorne	Ed Cunningham	Jerry Punch
January 4, 2005	ESPN Radio	Ron Franklin	Mike Gottfried	Erin Andrews
January 1, 2004	ESPN Radio	Dave Barnett	Bill Curry	Heather Cox
January 2, 2003	ESPN Radio	Dave Barnett	Bill Curry and Mike Golic	Holly Rowe
January 2, 2002	ESPN Radio	Dave Barnett	Bill Curry and Mike Golic	Michele Tafoya
January 3, 2001	ESPN Radio	Ron Franklin	Mike Gottfried	Adrien Karsten
January 1, 2000	ESPN Radio	Dave Barnett	Bill Curry	Dave Ryan
January 2, 1999	ESPN Radio	Dave Barnett	Bill Curry	Dave Ryan
January 2, 1998	CBS	Chuck Cooperstein	Jim Wacker	
December 31, 1996	CBS	Howard David	Phil Schaefer	
January 1, 1996	CBS	John Rooney	Phil Schaefer	
January 1, 1995	NBC	Don Criqui	Fran Curci	
January 1, 1994	NBC	Harry Kalas	Fran Curci	
January 1, 1993	NBC	Bill Rosinski	Jack Ham	
January 1, 1992	Mutual	Harry Kalas	Fran Curci	
January 1, 1991	Mutual	Tony Roberts	Tom Pagna	
January 1, 1990	Mutual	Tony Roberts	Tom Brookshier	
January 2, 1989	Mutual	Mark Champion	Fran Curci	
January 1, 1988	NBC	Bob Murphy	Howard Schnellenberger	
January 1, 1987	NBC	Bob Murphy	Howard Schnellenberger	
January 1, 1986	NBC	Bob Murphy	Howard Schnellenberger	
January 1, 1985	NBC	Bob Murphy	Howard Schnellenberger	
January 2, 1984	NBC	Bob Murphy	Donnie Duncan	
January 1, 1983	NBC	Bob Murphy	Donnie Duncan	
January 1, 1982	Mutual	Tony Roberts	Al Wester	
January 1, 1981	Mutual	Tony Roberts	Al Wester	
January 1, 1980	Mutual	Tony Roberts	Pat Sheridan	
January 1, 1979	Mutual	Tony Roberts	Sam Huff	
January 2, 1978	Mutual	Tony Roberts	Sam Huff	
January 1, 1977	Mutual	Don Criqui	Sam Huff	
January 1, 1976	NBC	Bob Ufer, Mike Treps		
January 1, 1975	NBC	Jay Randolph	Paul Maguire	
January 1, 1974	NBC	Charlie Jones	Sam DeLuca	
January 1, 1973	NBC	Jay Randolph	Dave Kocourek	
January 1, 1972	NBC	Jay Randolph	Dave Kocourek	
January 1, 1971	NBC	Jay Randolph	Dave Kocourek	
January 1, 1970	NBC	Charlie Jones	Elmer Angsman	
January 1, 1969	NBC	Bill Enis	Elmer Angsman	
January 1, 1968	NBC	Mel Allen	George Ratterman	
January 2, 1967	NBC	Mel Allen	Elmer Angsman	
January 1, 1966	NBC	Charlie Jones	George Ratterman	
January 1, 1965	NBC	Jim Gibbons	Billy Vessels	
January 1, 1964	ABC	Jim Gibbons	George Ratterman	
January 1, 1963	ABC	Jim Gibbons	Sam Huff	
January 1, 1962	ABC	Jim Gibbons	Bill Flemming	
January 2, 1961	CBS	Jim McKay	Pat Summerall	
January 1, 1960	CBS	Bill McColgan	Pat Summerall	
January 1, 1959	CBS	Jack Drees	Joe Foss	
January 1, 1958	CBS	Joe Boland	Herman Hickman	
January 1, 1957	CBS	Jim Gibbons		
January 2, 1956	CBS	Red Barber, Jim Gibbons	Dan Peterson	
January 1, 1955	CBS	Red Barber		
January 1, 1954	CBS	Bob Neal		
January 1, 1953	CBS	Jack Brickhouse		
January 1, 1952	CBS	Red Barber	Connie Desmond	
January 1, 1951	CBS	Mel Allen	Connie Desmond	
January 2, 1950	CBS	Mel Allen	Connie Desmond	
January 1, 1949	CBS	Red Barber		
January 1, 1948	CBS	Red Barber		
January 1, 1947	CBS	Red Barber		
January 1, 1946	CBS	Ted Husing	Jimmy Dolan	
January 1, 1945	CBS	Ted Husing	Jimmy Dolan	
January 1, 1944	CBS	Ted Husing	Jimmy Dolan	
January 1, 1943	CBS	Ted Husing	Jimmy Dolan	
January 1, 1942	CBS	Ted Husing	Jimmy Dolan	
January 1, 1941	CBS	Ted Husing	Jimmy Dolan	
January 1, 1940	CBS	Ted Husing	Jimmy Dolan	
January 2, 1939	CBS	Ted Husing	Jimmy Dolan	
January 1, 1938	CBS	Ted Husing	Jimmy Dolan	
January 1, 1937	CBS	Ted Husing	Jimmy Dolan	

== Local radio ==
Date	Flagship station	Play-by-play	Color commentator(s)	Sideline reporter(s)
January 3, 2014	WCCP-FM (Clemson); WBNS-FM (Ohio State)	Pete Yanity; Paul Keels	Will Merritt; Jim Lachey	Patrick Sapp; Marty Bannister
