= Bowl Championship Series on television and radio =

Broadcast coverage of college football

When the Bowl Championship Series was formed in 1998, television coverage was consolidated on the ABC Television Network. Beginning with the 2006 season, the Fox Broadcasting Company took over television coverage of the Sugar Bowl, Orange Bowl, and Fiesta Bowl games. ABC retained the Rose Bowl game under a separate contract. Radio broadcast coverage has been on ESPN Radio.

== Television ==
From 1999 to 2006 (1998–2005 seasons), all games of the BCS were televised by ABC Sports. Generally, coverage consisted of two games on New Year's Day, one on January 2, and one on either January 3 or 4. ABC paid nearly $25 million per year for the broadcast rights to the Fiesta, Sugar and Orange bowls during that time. Overall, the contract was worth $550 million over the eight years for all the bowl games.

Starting with the 2006 season, coverage would be split between ABC and Fox. Fox paid for each bowl game US$20 million. Four of the BCS bowl games were on FOX: the Orange Bowl, Sugar Bowl, Fiesta Bowl, and a new fifth game, the BCS National Championship Game. ABC will continue to broadcast the Rose Bowl Game. ABC had a $300 million eight-year contract that extends to 2014 for the broadcast rights for the Rose Bowl.

In 2007, ABC and Fox showed one game each on January 1, Fox then showed one game each on January 2 and 3 and came back with the championship game on January 8. A similar schedule is planned for future years.

Fox showed all BCS championship games the first three years of the contract, while in 2010 the Rose Bowl stadium was the location of the BCS Championship game, and ABC televised it.

In 2011, ESPN will televise all BCS championship games from January 2011 through January 2014. This is the most prominent sports championship not shown on broadcast television. The 2011 BCS championship was the most watched program in the history of cable television, with 27.3 million viewers in 17.7 million households.

=== 2013–14 announcers ===
Game	Date, Time (ET)	Network	Play-by-Play	Color Analysts	Sideline Reporter
Rose Bowl	January 1, 5:00 p.m.	ESPN	Brent Musburger	Kirk Herbstreit	Heather Cox and Tom Rinaldi
Fiesta Bowl	January 1, 8:30 p.m.	ESPN	Sean McDonough	Chris Spielman	Shannon Spake
Sugar Bowl	January 2, 8:30 p.m.	ESPN	Brad Nessler	Todd Blackledge	Holly Rowe
Orange Bowl	January 3, 8:30 p.m.	ESPN	Joe Tessitore	Matt Millen	Maria Taylor
BCS National Championship	January 6, 8:30 p.m.	ESPN	Brent Musburger	Kirk Herbstreit	Heather Cox and Tom Rinaldi

=== 2012–13 announcers ===
Game	Date, Time (ET)	Network	Play-by-Play	Color Analysts	Sideline Reporter
Rose Bowl	January 1, 5:00 p.m.	ESPN	Brent Musburger	Kirk Herbstreit	Heather Cox and Tom Rinaldi
Orange Bowl	January 1, 8:30 p.m.	ESPN	Joe Tessitore	Matt Millen	Maria Taylor
Sugar Bowl	January 2, 8:30 p.m.	ESPN	Sean McDonough	Chris Spielman	Quint Kessenich
Fiesta Bowl	January 3, 8:30 p.m.	ESPN	Brad Nessler	Todd Blackledge	Holly Rowe
BCS National Championship	January 7, 8:30 p.m.	ESPN	Brent Musburger	Kirk Herbstreit	Heather Cox and Tom Rinaldi

=== 2011–12 announcers ===
Game	Date, Time (ET)	Network	Play-by-Play	Color Analysts	Sideline Reporter
Rose Bowl	January 2, 5:00 p.m.	ESPN	Brent Musburger	Kirk Herbstreit	Erin Andrews
Fiesta Bowl	January 2, 8:30 p.m.	ESPN	Sean McDonough	Matt Millen	Heather Cox
Sugar Bowl	January 3, 8:30 p.m.	ESPN	Brad Nessler	Todd Blackledge	Holly Rowe
Orange Bowl	January 4, 8:30 p.m.	ESPN	Mike Tirico	Ron Jaworski and Jon Gruden	Lisa Salters
BCS National Championship	January 9, 8:30 p.m.	ESPN	Brent Musburger	Kirk Herbstreit	Erin Andrews and Tom Rinaldi

=== 2010–11 announcers ===
Game	Date, Time (ET)	Network	Play-by-Play	Color Analysts	Sideline Reporter
Rose Bowl	January 1, 5:00 p.m.	ESPN	Brent Musburger	Kirk Herbstreit	Erin Andrews
Fiesta Bowl	January 1, 8:30 p.m.	ESPN	Sean McDonough	Matt Millen	Heather Cox
Orange Bowl	January 3, 8:30 p.m.	ESPN	Mike Tirico	Ron Jaworski and Jon Gruden	Michele Tafoya
Sugar Bowl	January 4, 8:30 p.m.	ESPN	Brad Nessler	Todd Blackledge	Holly Rowe
BCS National Championship	January 10, 8:30 p.m.	ESPN	Brent Musburger	Kirk Herbstreit	Erin Andrews and Tom Rinaldi

=== 2009–10 announcers ===
Game	Date, Time (ET)	Network	Play-by-Play	Color Analysts	Sideline Reporter
Rose Bowl	January 1, 4:30 p.m.	ABC	Brent Musburger	Kirk Herbstreit	Lisa Salters
Sugar Bowl	January 1, 8:30 p.m.	Fox	Thom Brennaman	Brian Billick	Chris Myers
Fiesta Bowl	January 4, 8 p.m.	Fox	Sam Rosen	Tim Ryan	Chris Myers
Orange Bowl	January 5, 8 p.m.	Fox	Dick Stockton	Charles Davis	Chris Myers and Laura Okmin
BCS National Championship	January 8, 8 p.m.	ABC	Brent Musburger	Kirk Herbstreit	Lisa Salters and Tom Rinaldi

=== 2008–09 announcers ===
Game	Date, Time (ET)	Network	Play-by-Play	Color Analysts	Sideline Reporter
Rose Bowl	January 1, 4:30 p.m.	ABC	Brent Musburger	Kirk Herbstreit	Lisa Salters
Orange Bowl	January 1, 8:30 p.m.	Fox	Thom Brennaman	Charles Davis	Chris Myers
Sugar Bowl	January 2, 8 p.m.	Fox	Kenny Albert	Daryl Johnston	Chris Myers and Charissa Thompson
Fiesta Bowl	January 5, 8 p.m.	Fox	Matt Vasgersian	Tim Ryan	Chris Myers and Laura Okmin
BCS National Championship	January 8, 8 p.m.	Fox	Thom Brennaman	Charles Davis	Chris Myers

=== 2007–08 announcers ===
Game	Date, Time (ET)	Network	Play-by-Play	Color Analysts	Sideline Reporter
Rose Bowl	January 1, 5 p.m.	ABC	Brent Musburger	Kirk Herbstreit	Lisa Salters
Sugar Bowl	January 1, 8:30 p.m.	Fox	Thom Brennaman	Charles Davis	Chris Myers
Fiesta Bowl	January 2, 8 p.m.	Fox	Matt Vasgersian	Terry Donahue and Pat Haden	Laura Okmin
Orange Bowl	January 3, 8 p.m.	Fox	Kenny Albert	Daryl Johnston and Barry Alvarez	Jeanne Zelasko
BCS National Championship	January 7, 8 p.m.	Fox	Thom Brennaman	Charles Davis	Chris Myers

From Fox Sports, December 4, 2007.

=== 2006–07 announcers ===
Game	Date, Time (ET)	Network	Play-by-Play	Color Analysts	Sideline Reporter
Rose Bowl	January 1, 5 p.m.	ABC	Brent Musburger	Bob Davie and Kirk Herbstreit	Bonnie Bernstein and Lisa Salters
Fiesta Bowl	January 1, 8:30 p.m.	Fox	Thom Brennaman	Barry Alvarez and Charles Davis	Chris Myers
Orange Bowl	January 2, 8 p.m.	Fox	Matt Vasgersian	Terry Donahue and Pat Haden	Laura Okmin
Sugar Bowl	January 3, 8 p.m.	Fox	Kenny Albert	Terry Bradshaw and Howie Long	Jeanne Zelasko
BCS National Championship	January 8, 8 p.m.	Fox	Thom Brennaman	Barry Alvarez and Charles Davis	Chris Myers

=== Previous seasons ===
In 1999, 2002, 2003, and 2006, Keith Jackson was the play-by-play announcer for the national championship, with Bob Griese in 1999, Dan Fouts in 2003 and 2006, and Tim Brant in 2002. Brent Musburger and Gary Danielson were the announcers for the 2000 and 2004 title games, while Brad Nessler and Griese called the 2001 and 2005 title games.

Other ESPN/ABC announcers who called the various BCS games during its eight-year run were Mike Tirico, Sean McDonough, Ed Cunningham, Kirk Herbstreit, Bob Davie, David Norrie, Terry Bowden, and Dean Blevins. Sideline reporters primarily included Lynn Swann, Todd Harris, and Jack Arute.

== Radio ==
ESPN Radio provides coverage of all five games. Usually, the announcers called games on television throughout the regular season. For example, Ron Franklin and Davie called the 2006 Rose Bowl for the network, and Holly Rowe was the sideline reporter.

=== 2013–14 announcers ===
Game	Date, Time (ET)	Radio Network	Play-by-Play	Color Analysts	Sideline Reporter
Rose Bowl	January 1, 5:00 p.m.	ESPN Radio	Bill Rosinski	David Norrie	Joe Schad
Fiesta Bowl	January 1, 8:30 p.m.	ESPN Radio	Bob Wischusen	Rod Gilmore	Quint Kessenich
Sugar Bowl	January 2, 8:30 p.m.	ESPN Radio	Bill Rosinski	Dennis Franchione	Joe Schad
Orange Bowl	January 3, 8:30 p.m.	ESPN Radio	Sean McDonough	Chris Spielman	Shannon Spake
BCS National Championship	January 6, 8:30 p.m.	ESPN Radio	Mike Tirico	Todd Blackledge	Holly Rowe and Joe Schad

=== 2012–13 announcers ===
Game	Date, Time (ET)	Radio Network	Play-by-Play	Color Analysts	Sideline Reporter
Rose Bowl	January 1, 5:00 p.m.	ESPN Radio	Dave Pasch	Brian Griese	Jenn Brown
Fiesta Bowl	January 1, 8:30 p.m.	ESPN Radio	Bill Rosinski	David Norrie	Joe Schad
Sugar Bowl	January 2, 8:30 p.m.	ESPN Radio	Bob Wischusen	Danny Kanell	Allison Williams
Orange Bowl	January 3, 8:30 p.m.	ESPN Radio	Bill Rosinski	David Norrie	Joe Schad
BCS National Championship	January 7, 8:30 p.m.	ESPN Radio	Mike Tirico	Todd Blackledge	Holly Rowe and Joe Schad

=== 2011–12 announcers ===
Game	Date, Time (ET)	Radio Network	Play-by-Play	Color Analysts	Sideline Reporter
Rose Bowl	January 2, 5:00 p.m.	ESPN Radio	Dave Pasch	Chris Spielman	Tom Rinaldi
Fiesta Bowl	January 2, 8:30 p.m.	ESPN Radio	Bill Rosinski	David Norrie	Joe Schad
Sugar Bowl	January 3, 8:30 p.m.	ESPN Radio	Sean McDonough	Matt Millen	Heather Cox
Orange Bowl	January 4, 8:30 p.m.	ESPN Radio	Joe Tessitore	Rod Gilmore	Quint Kessenich
BCS National Championship	January 9, 8:30 p.m.	ESPN Radio	Mike Tirico	Todd Blackledge	Holly Rowe and Joe Schad

=== 2010–11 announcers ===
Game	Date, Time (ET)	Radio Network	Play-by-Play	Color Analysts	Sideline Reporter
Rose Bowl	January 1, 5:00 p.m.	ESPN Radio	Bill Rosinski	David Norrie	Joe Schad
Fiesta Bowl	January 1, 8:30 p.m.	ESPN Radio	Dave LaMont	Ed Cunningham	Jeannine Edwards
Orange Bowl	January 3, 8:30 p.m.	ESPN Radio	Bill Rosinski	David Norrie	Joe Schad
Sugar Bowl	January 4, 8:30 p.m.	ESPN Radio	Sean McDonough	Matt Millen	Heather Cox
BCS National Championship	January 10, 8:30 p.m.	ESPN Radio	Mike Tirico	Jon Gruden	Joe Schad

=== 2009–10 announcers ===
Game	Date, Time (ET)	Radio Network	Play-by-Play	Color Analysts	Sideline Reporter
Rose Bowl	January 1, 4:30 p.m.	ESPN Radio	Mike Tirico	Jon Gruden	Shelley Smith
Sugar Bowl	January 1, 8:30 p.m.	ESPN Radio	Bill Rosinski	Dennis Franchione	Joe Schad
Fiesta Bowl	January 4, 8 p.m.	ESPN Radio	Brad Nessler	Todd Blackledge	Erin Andrews
Orange Bowl	January 5, 8 p.m.	ESPN Radio	Sean McDonough	Matt Millen	Holly Rowe
BCS National Championship Game	January 7, 8 p.m.	ESPN Radio	Mike Tirico	Jon Gruden and Todd Blackledge	Wendi Nix

=== 2008–09 announcers ===
Game	Date, Time (ET)	Radio Network	Play-by-Play	Color Analysts	Sideline Reporter
Rose Bowl	January 1, 4:30 p.m.	ESPN Radio	Mike Tirico	David Norrie	Erin Andrews
Orange Bowl	January 1, 8:30 p.m.	ESPN Radio	Ron Franklin	Ed Cunningham	Jack Arute
Sugar Bowl	January 2, 8 p.m.	ESPN Radio	Sean McDonough	Bob Davie	Holly Rowe
Fiesta Bowl	January 5, 8 p.m.	ESPN Radio	Dave Barnett	Dennis Franchione	Dave Ryan
BCS National Championship Game	January 8, 8 p.m.	ESPN Radio	Brent Musburger	Kirk Herbstreit	Lisa Salters

=== 2007–08 announcers ===
Game	Date, Time (ET)	Radio Network	Play-by-Play	Color Analysts	Sideline Reporter
Rose Bowl	January 1, 5 p.m.	ESPN Radio	Dave Barnett	Rod Gilmore	Erin Andrews
Sugar Bowl	January 1, 8:30 p.m.	ESPN Radio	Ron Franklin	Ed Cunningham	Jack Arute
Fiesta Bowl	January 2, 8 p.m.	ESPN Radio	Sean McDonough	Bob Davie	Holly Rowe
Orange Bowl	January 3, 8 p.m.	ESPN Radio	Brad Nessler	Bob Griese and Paul Maguire	Bonnie Bernstein
BCS National Championship Game	January 7, 8 p.m.	ESPN Radio	Brent Musburger	Kirk Herbstreit	Lisa Salters

=== 2006–07 announcers ===
Game	Date, Time (ET)	Radio Network	Play-by-Play	Color Analysts	Sideline Reporter
Rose Bowl	January 1, 5 p.m.	ESPN Radio	Sean McDonough	Chris Spielman	Todd Harris
Fiesta Bowl	January 1, 8:30 p.m.	ESPN Radio	Ron Franklin	Ed Cunningham	Dr. Jerry Punch
Orange Bowl	January 2, 8 p.m.	ESPN Radio	Mike Patrick	Todd Blackledge	Holly Rowe
Sugar Bowl	January 3, 8 p.m.	ESPN Radio	Brad Nessler	Bob Griese and Paul Maguire	Heather Cox
BCS National Championship Game	January 8, 8 p.m.	ESPN Radio	Brent Musburger	Bob Davie and Todd Blackledge	Lisa Salters

== Relationship between co-holders ==
FOX currently is not permitting ESPN to re-broadcast BCS game highlights. For example, despite both the historic nature of the 2007 BCS championship game (Florida's win gave it simultaneous Division I football and basketball championships, which had never before been accomplished) and the compelling 2007 Fiesta Bowl, Fox would not allow ESPN Classic (a sister network to rights co-holder ESPN) to show the games as "instant classics." Instead, Fox Sports Net aired both games as hour-long versions of The Best Damn Sports Show Period later in January.

Similarly, some ESPN programs were not allowed to show highlights of any of Fox's BCS games, at least not some days removed from them. For example, when Ted Ginn Jr. was the subject of "happy trails" during an episode of Pardon the Interruption that aired in mid-February, the show's producers could only show still photographs from the contest, not even clips of his opening kickoff runback for a touchdown (Ginn Jr. had announced that he was entering the NFL draft). Also, videotape of the same game was missing from ESPN's coverage of the Gators' repeat championship win in the basketball tournament later that year. However, it is unknown if ESPN or its other channels had sought to air footage from the BCS title game.

However, footage did appear on ESPN's ESPY Awards that July and again on the SportsCenter specials "Year in Review" and "Top 10 Games" in December.

In 2008, the relationship between the Rose Bowl and the BCS was downplayed before and during the telecast. Pre-game promotional announcements that aired on ESPN, ESPN2, and ABC did not mention the BCS in any way. During the USC-Illinois game, the logo was not displayed and the announcers did not mention on-air that the game was part of the series. As for footage, Fox did consent to share highlights with ESPN, but those that aired on discussion shows like First Take contained the continuous label "COURTESY Fox SPORTS." Those on SportsCenter did not carry the label. Plans for long-term use remain unclear. However, ESPN will hold exclusive rights to all BCS products (including footage and internet) starting with the 2011 edition.

== See also ==
- College football on television
- College football on radio
- Fox Sports
- ESPN on ABC
- List of announcers of major college bowl games
