= List of UPI reporters =

This is a list of notable reporters who worked for United Press International during their careers:

- Carl W. Ackerman, 1913-1914 Albany, NY and Washington, D.C. bureau reporter, 1915-1917 Berlin Correspondent
- Howard Arenstein, 1978 Jerusalem bureau chief 1981 editor on UPI's foreign desk in New York and Washington.
- James Baar, editor in the UPI Washington Bureau
- Arnaud de Borchgrave, 1947 -1951 Brussels bureau chief, 1998 president of UPI, 2001 editor-at-large of UPI based in Washington DC
- Joe Bob Briggs
- David Brinkley
- Don Canaan UPI Ohio 1996-1999
- Lucien Carr
- Pye Chamberlayne
- John Chambers, son of Whittaker Chambers (UPI Radio, 1960s)
  - Audio recap of 87th Congress (1962)
  - Audio recap on Presidential Election (1964)
  - Funeral Services for Adlai Stevenson (1965)
  - Civil Rights Movement in 1965 (1965)
  - Preview 1966 (1966)
  - "From the People" with Hubert Humphrey (text) (February 1968)
  - Audio on LBJ's signing of Civil Rights Act of 1968 (11 April 1968)
  - Text of eyewitness account of RFK assassination (1968)
- Marquis Childs
- Charles Collingwood
- Walter Cronkite, 1939-1950, covered World War II for UP.
- William Boyd Dickinson
- Bill Downs
- Marc S. Ellenbogen
- James M. Flinchum
- Sylvana Foa
- Oscar Fraley
- Thomas Friedman
- Joseph L. Galloway
- Carmen Gentile
- Seymour Hersh
- John Hoerr
- Richard C. Hottelet
- Stewart Kellerman
- Michael Keon, covered the Chinese Civil War in the late 1940s
- David Kirby
- Paul Ladewski
- Eli Lake
- Larry LeSueur
- Eric Lyman
- Eugene Lyons
- Carlos Mendo
- Webb Miller
- Randy Minkoff
- Joe W. Morgan, editor who covered the Alger Hiss trial, Joseph Stalin death, Sputnik launch, Yuri Gagarin spaceflight, Robert F. Kennedy assassination
- M. R. Akhtar Mukul
- Ron Nessen
- Richard S. Newcombe
- Dan Olmsted
- Bill Rosinski
- Milton Richman
- Eric Sevareid
- Steve Sailer
- Harrison Salisbury
- Mac Sebree
- Neil Sheehan
- William Shirer
- Howard K. Smith
- Merriman Smith
- Jeff Stein
- Barry Sussman
- Roger Tatarian
- Helen Thomas
- Morris DeHaven Tracy
- Martin Walker
- Kate Webb
- Karl Henry Von Wiegand
- Christopher Alan Benson
- Steve Wilstein
- Lester Ziffren
