= Minkoff =

Minkoff is a surname. Notable people with the surname include:

- Fran Minkoff (1915–2002), American songwriter
- Nathaniel M. Minkoff (1893–1984), New York labor leader and assemblyman
- N. B. Minkoff (1893–1958), New York Yiddish poet, critic, and educator
- Randy Minkoff, American writer and journalist
- Rebecca Minkoff, American handbag, accessory and clothes designer
- Rob Minkoff (born 1962), American animator and film director
- Rachel Minkoff, American Ph.D., social worker, and published academic
