= College football on television =

College football games have been broadcast in the United States since 1939, beginning with the 1939 Waynesburg vs. Fordham football game on September 30 in New York City. College football telecasts were historically very restricted due to there being only three major television networks and also because the NCAA controlled all television rights and limited the number of games that aired to protect attendance. A 1984 ruling declaring the NCAA's television restrictions illegal, along with the introduction of sports-specific television networks has increased the amount of air-time available for coverage. Today, dozens of games are available for viewing each week of the football season. Other coverage includes local broadcasts of weekly coach's programs. These programs annually garner high television ratings, and have become an important sources of revenue for the universities and their athletics programs.

Coverage is dependent on negotiations between the broadcaster and the college football conference or team. The televised games may change from year-to-year depending on which teams are having a strong season, although some traditional rivalry games are broadcast each year. Some games are traditionally associated with a specific event or holiday, and viewing the game itself can become a holiday tradition for fans. Post-season bowl games, including the College Football Playoff, are presently all televised, most of them by the ESPN networks.

Universities found to have seriously violated NCAA rules have occasionally been penalized with a "television ban"; the effect can equal that of the "death penalty". The sanction is rarely applied except for the most egregious of circumstances, such as the Southern Methodist University football scandal.

== History ==
=== Prior to television ===
College football games have been broadcast on radio since 1921, beginning with the 1921 West Virginia vs. Pittsburgh football game on October 8 in Pittsburgh.

Prior to that, various other means of communication were used. For example, in 1911, more than 1,000 people gathered in downtown Lawrence, Kansas, to watch a mechanical reproduction of the 1911 Kansas vs. Missouri football game while it was being played. A Western Union telegraph wire was set up direct from Columbia, Missouri, to relay the action.

=== Early televised broadcasts ===
The first televised college football game occurred during the "experimental" era of television's broadcasting history, when a game between Fordham University and Waynesburg College was broadcast on September 30, 1939. One month later, Kansas State's homecoming contest against the University of Nebraska was the second broadcast and first homecoming game to be broadcast on October 23, 1939. The following season, on October 5, 1940, what is described as the "first commercially televised game" between the University of Maryland and the University of Pennsylvania was broadcast by Philco. Fairly sporadic broadcasts continued throughout World War II.

By 1950, a small number of football schools, including Penn (ABC) and the University of Notre Dame (DuMont Television Network), had entered into individual contracts with networks to broadcast their games regionally. In fact, all of Penn's home games were broadcast on ABC during the 1950 season under a contract that paid Penn $150,000. However, prior to the 1951 season, the NCAA – alarmed by reports that indicated television decreased attendance at games – asserted control and prohibited live broadcasts of games. Although the NCAA successfully forced Penn and Notre Dame to break their contracts, the NCAA suffered withering attacks for its 1951 policy, faced threats of antitrust hearings, and eventually caved in and lifted blackouts of certain sold-out games. Nonetheless, the first national broadcast of a live college football game, which was also the first coast-to-coast live broadcast of any sports contest, was Duke at the University of Pittsburgh on September 29, 1951, on NBC. Bowl games were always outside the control of the NCAA, and the 1952 Rose Bowl at the end of that season was the first national telecast of a college bowl game, on NBC.

For the 1952 season, the NCAA relented somewhat, but limited telecasts to one nationally broadcast game each week. The NCAA sold the exclusive rights to broadcast the weekly game to NBC for $1,144,000. The first game shown under this contract was Texas Christian University against the University of Kansas, on September 20, 1952. In 1953, the NCAA allowed NBC to add what it called "panorama" coverage of multiple regional broadcasts for certain weeks – shifting national viewers to the most interesting game during its telecast. NBC lost the college football contract beginning in 1954, prompting it to carry Canadian football instead. There were some attempts at workarounds during this time frame; ABC Sports ran some Notre Dame Fighting Irish football games, condensed to remove time between plays and featuring Harry Wismer at the microphone, in fall 1953. The Notre Dame games were filmed and broadcast the night after they were played; the service would not continue beyond that year.

The NCAA believed that broadcasting one game a week would prevent further controversy while limiting any decrease in attendance. However, the Big Ten Conference was unhappy with the arrangement, and it pressured the NCAA to allow regional telecasts as well. Finally, in 1955 the NCAA revised its plan, keeping eight national games while permitting true regional telecasts during five specified weeks of the season. This was essentially the television plan that stayed in place until the University of Oklahoma and the University of Georgia filed suit against the NCAA in 1981, alleging antitrust violations.

Bowl games were always exempt from the NCAA's television regulations, and the games' organizers were free to sign rights deals with any network. Mizlou Television Network, for instance, carried many of the bowl games (mostly lower-end bowls) despite not holding any regular season rights.

=== Decentralization ===
On June 27, 1984, the U.S. Supreme Court ruled in NCAA v. Board of Regents of the University of Oklahoma that the NCAA's television plan violated the Sherman Antitrust Act. As a result, individual schools and athletic conferences were freed to negotiate contracts on their own behalf. The year after the Supreme Court decision, nearly 200 games were televised, compared to the previous year's 89. College football's television ratings slumped due to market saturation, and the price of a 30-second advertisement plunged from $57,000 in 1983 to $15,000 in 1984, while the combined take from network television fell more than 60 percent. Despite the monetary suffering of the universities, the additional coverage had a positive impact for fans of college football. "Everyone talks about money, but no one seems to care about the football fan. He is the one who benefited from deregulation. And he isn't complaining", said Chuck Neinas, the former commissioner of the Big Eight Conference. Together with the growth of cable television, this ruling resulted in the explosion of broadcast options currently available.

However, in the immediate wake of the ruling, most schools still decided to jointly negotiate their television contracts through the now-defunct College Football Association. The Big Ten Conference and Pacific-10 Conference were not members of the CFA, opting to negotiate their own TV deals.

=== Effects of television exposure ===
Television exposure has been used as a selling point in recruiting high school athletes. "We’re recruiting all over the country, and it's nice to be able to go in someone's home and say, ‘You can turn on the TV and watch the Buckeyes six to eight times a year", said former Ohio State head coach John Cooper.

Television money and generous donors have allowed universities to provide modern facilities and luxurious amenities to college football teams. The Darrell K Royal–Texas Memorial Stadium at the University of Texas offers fans the opportunity to lease suites for $88,000 a year. The suites include theater-style seats, televisions, kitchenettes, and bars. The athletes ride to practice in chartered buses and dress beneath a three-dimensional 20-foot lighted longhorn in a locker room that includes a nutrition center, players’ lounge, and "state-of-the-art" ventilation system.

Nationally televised games also brought new notoriety, revenue, and growth for leagues that had rarely appeared on television. As the cable networks grew and expanded, they sought more games to fill time. Former Mid-American Conference (MAC) Commissioner Rick Chryst attributes his league's expansion to a deal that put several MAC games per year on ESPN.

In the 1950s, conventional wisdom suggested that television allowed football fans to watch their favorite teams for free from the comfort of their own homes, and this was to blame for falling attendance. A 1948 study conducted by the Crossley Corporation at the NCAA's request found that fans thought watching televised games was equal or superior to watching from the stands. In 1950, a study by the National Opinion Research Center at the University of Chicago said that attendance at college football games would have been 40 percent higher if no games had been televised. In the long term, the publicity provided by college football telecasts helped to give the sport exposure to potential ticket buyers, increasing ticket sales. The popularity of televised college football has been accompanied by a growth in game attendance. In 1949, when the U.S. population was around 150 million, 17.5 million spectators attended a college football game. By 2012, after the population had doubled, attendance had grown proportionally higher, at nearly 50 million people.

=== The modern era ===
When Notre Dame left the CFA to sign an exclusive deal with NBC in 1991, it shocked the college football world and marked the true beginning of the modern era. Then, in 1996, CBS, which had been shut out of the CFA broadcasts in the mid-1990s when ABC held the contract (and coincidentally was in desperate need of live sports after losing its major professional sports rights in 1994), successfully convinced the Southeastern Conference to break from the CFA, signing its own conference deal. The CFA disbanded in 1997.

One of the most significant side-effects of the changes in television policy since 1991 has been the sharp decrease in independent schools and realignment of athletic conferences, as schools sought to pool and increase their bargaining power; few schools had the clout or national following that could garner an exclusive contract the way Notre Dame did. Prominent independents Pitt and Penn State joined the old Big East in 1991 and the Big Ten in 1993, respectively. Television has also driven the trend of universities (generally mid-majors) playing football on weekdays rather than the traditional Saturdays, in order to have their games broadcast.

The pursuit of television money has provided financial independence to many big-time university athletic programs, since they can independently auction their "product" to the highest bidder. Some universities have limited authority over the athletic directors and coaches. In 2009, Florida President J. Bernard Machen said that due to the presence of ESPN money, the university no longer had control of its athletics department. Studies have also shown that success of big-time sports programs alters students’ academic behavior, reducing the amount of activity at the library and lowering men's grade point averages with each victory.

Television and cable networks control the schedule of football games. ESPN broadcasts nationally televised college football games on Thursday nights each week, making it the college equivalent of the NFL's Monday Night Football. The energy and excitement of such an atmosphere generally benefits the home teams, which have a winning record on Thursday nights. The midweek games are scheduled with no consideration of academics, rest, and recovery for athletes and university logistical issues such as competition for parking between faculty, students, and fans. For example, the logistical issues are such a problem for the University of Georgia that midweek home games are forbidden. However, most coaches are happy to tackle the logistical issues for the sake of TV scheduling and money.

In the 2010s, networks began experimenting with new technologies to expand beyond the standard two-dimensional television system. ESPN 3D carried a number of games in 3D television during its lifetime, beginning in 2011 and ending with the channel's shutdown in 2013; a lack of 3D television adoption was blamed for the program's failure. Fox began a series of virtual reality broadcasts in 2016, which were made available to dedicated VR headsets and smartphones with stereoscopes; these were discontinued by 2018.

== Broadcast rights ==
=== U.S. Networks ===
==== ABC ====
ABC has been airing college football since 1950. Chris Schenkel and Bud Wilkinson were the number one broadcast team through 1973. Keith Jackson, its best-known college football play-by-play man, announced games from 1966 through 2005 on ABC (and for 14 years before that for various outlets), and was considered by many to be "the voice of college football." Jackson was ABC's lead play-by play man for 25 years, from 1974 through 1998. He originally was to retire after the 1999 Fiesta Bowl, but agreed to remain on a more restricted schedule (primarily broadcasting West Coast games) and remained with ABC through the 2006 Rose Bowl.

In 1954, 1960 and 1961, and then from 1966 through 1981, ABC was the exclusive network home for regular season NCAA football telecasts. In 1982 and 1983, ABC and CBS split the package. In 1984, after the NCAA television contract was invalidated by the U.S. Supreme Court, ABC began a three-year deal televising CFA games, featuring most major college teams except members of the Big Ten and Pacific-10, the Atlantic Coast Conference and the University of Miami, the games of which were televised by CBS. From 1987 to 1990, ABC televised Big Ten and Pacific-10 games. Since 1991, ABC has had contracts with most of the major BCS conferences, which leads it to broadcast many of its games regionally. ABC began airing a weekly Saturday night primetime football game in the fall of 2006, when the network's sports division converted to ESPN on ABC. Nearly all regional ABC games that air on a given Saturday (and a very large number of other, exclusive games) are also available as part of a pay-per-view package called ESPN GamePlan, and online via ESPN3.

==== NBC ====
NBC broadcast the Rose Bowl beginning in 1952 until the 1988 Rose Bowl when ABC took over. It had the Orange Bowl from 1965 through 1995. (The 1971 contest was the very last sporting event on US television to carry cigarette ads.) NBC also aired the Fiesta Bowl from 1978 through 1995, and the Cotton Bowl from 1993 to 1995. NBC also contracted with the NCAA to broadcast regular season games in 1952–1953, 1955–1959 and 1964–1965.

NBC has an exclusive contract with Notre Dame, which began in 1991. Since that time, NBC has carried nationally all of Notre Dame's home games, paying at least $9 million per season for broadcast rights. Recently, Notre Dame's ratings have been down significantly due to relatively poor play and because NBC does not telecast a game every week as CBS and ABC do (when Notre Dame plays away, NBC has no college football, and thus the network has no set regular schedule); Notre Dame games on NBC drew less than half the ratings that CBS and ABC averaged for their college football games in 2008. NBC was long the home of the annual "Bayou Classic" between Grambling State University and Southern University at the Mercedes-Benz Superdome, but NBC has since moved the game to its NBCSN cable network. The game is well known for its Battle of the Bands between the schools at halftime.

==== CBS ====
CBS contracted with the NCAA to broadcast regular season games in 1962 and 1963. CBS shared the NCAA package with ABC in 1982 and 1983 and was also required to locally broadcast four Division III contests each year as part of that contract. (For the 1982 season, these four contests were instead aired nationwide and produced using the staff of the NFL on CBS, which had been idled due to a players' strike that year.) From 1984 to 1986, CBS televised games involving the Big Ten, Pacific-10, and Atlantic Coast Conferences, plus the University of Miami. From 1987 to 1990, CBS televised CFA, ACC and Miami games. CBS broadcast several important games in the 1980s, such as the classic Boston College–Miami game that ended with Doug Flutie's Hail Mary on November 23, 1984, and the "Catholics vs. Convicts" showdowns between Notre Dame and Miami from 1987 to 1990. CBS did not televise any regular season college football games from 1991 to 1995. The network aired Big East games from 1996 to 2000. From 1996 until 2022, CBS has broadcast SEC games; the network held the first pick for any game where an SEC team is at home, along with the rights to televise the SEC Championship game.

The network also broadcasts the annual Army–Navy Game, the Air Force Academy's games vs. Army and Navy, and the Sun Bowl on New Year's Eve. CBS has broadcast the Sun Bowl (currently one of the few bowls not on an ESPN network) every year since 1968. From 1958 to 1992 and again from 1996 to 1998, CBS broadcast the Cotton Bowl annually. CBS aired the Fiesta Bowl from 1975 to 1977 and again after the 1995, 1996 and 1997 seasons, and also broadcast the Orange Bowl from 1996 to 1998.

==== Fox ====
Although its regional networks also aired games, until 2012, Fox did not air any regular season college football games. It did, however, air the Bowl Championship Series from 2006 to 2009 (excluding any event held at the Rose Bowl, whose rights were held by ABC) and aired the Cotton Bowl Classic from 1999 to 2015. In 2011, it began airing the Big Ten Football Championship Game (in conjunction with its operations of Big Ten Network), and the Pac-12 Championship Game (alternating with ESPN). In 2012, Fox began airing regular season college football games from the Pac-12 and Big 12 conferences. In 2016 and 2017, Fox acquired the Foster Farms Bowl and Holiday Bowl respectively.

On July 24, 2017, the Big Ten Conference announced that Fox had acquired the conference's Tier 1 football rights under a six-year deal beginning in the 2017 season, giving Fox first choice of Big Ten games over co-rightsholder ESPN.

==== The CW ====
In July 2023, Raycom Sports announced that it had sold a package of Atlantic Coast Conference broadcasts to The CW, consisting of 13 football games, 28 men's basketball games, and 9 women's basketball games per-season. The CW aired its first ACC broadcast on September 9, 2023, featuring Cincinnati at Pittsburgh.

In November of 2023, The CW announced a partnership with Barstool Sports to televise the Arizona Bowl, which had been exclusive to Barstool’s social media platforms since 2021, beginning with the 2023 edition of the contest.

==== PBS ====
PBS briefly carried the Ivy League in the 1980s, produced by WGBH-TV Boston, while many other state networks carried the games of their partner universities. Eventually, the airing of sports on public television became unworkable: most public television outlets operated under non-commercial educational licenses, which prohibited them from selling advertising or collecting retransmission consent fees. As the cost of rights began to skyrocket, these stations lacked the necessary revenue streams to keep up with the commercial networks; independent public stations could not afford rights, and state-owned networks got shut out when the state universities opted to make more money by selling the rights (usually in conjunction with their athletic conferences) to commercial networks.

=== Cable stations ===
TBS became the first cable station to nationally broadcast college football live when it began airing games during the 1982 season. The games were aired under a special "supplemental" television contract with the NCAA. ESPN followed later the same year, starting with a simulcast of the Independence Bowl match-up between Kansas State and the University of Wisconsin on December 11, 1982, which was the first college football game shown live on ESPN. (TBS subsequently left the field for several years, but again broadcast college football games from 2002 to 2006, showing Big 12 and Pac-10 matchups sublicensed from Fox Sports Net.)

In the wake of the 1984 Supreme Court ruling that broke the NCAA monopoly, ESPN immediately began airing regular season games live, starting with a contest between Pittsburgh and BYU on September 1, 1984. The network aired a 48-game package that year. ESPN2 began broadcasting live games in 1994, ESPNU began in 2005.

ABC gets first choice of games over the ESPN networks, especially from the American Athletic Conference, Big Ten, and ACC, because ABC and ESPN are owned by the same company. Many marquee games will still air on ESPN so they can air in prime-time, without being limited to regional viewers or GamePlan subscribers, but not giving non-cable owners a chance to see the games (unlike the NFL, games on ESPN are not required to be simulcast on over-the-air stations in local markets). This also occurs because CBS, not ABC, owns broadcast TV rights to the SEC, and thus only the ESPN networks can air the second and third-choice games (normally on Saturday nights); CBS having made the first pick. Likewise, FSN is the cable partner for Big 12 and Pac-12 games, and so only ABC can air games from those conference packages (it normally has the first pick), aside from a handful of games from each conference that ESPN purchases each year.

FSN sublicensed games to TBS from 2002 to 2006 from the Big 12 and Pac-10 Conferences and to Versus from 2007 to 2010. In 2011, FSN moved those games to FX. Joining the Big 12 and Pac-12 Conferences on FX will be Conference USA. Those games moved to Fox Sports 1 upon the channel's launch in 2013.

BET carried college football games from historically black colleges and universities under the Black College Football banner from 1981 through 2005 (in later years, the coverage was co-produced by CBS). This ended after the breakup of CBS and Viacom. Black college football games are now seen on the ESPN networks and on Aspire (Aspire also reruns select classic HBCU games from years past); Bounce TV had previously aired HBCU games in 2012 and 2013 before dropping them.

In the early 2000s, entire networks devoted to college sports, including college football, began to appear. Fox College Sports began in 2002. College Sports Television (now CBS Sports Network) debuted in 2002, becoming a CBS subsidiary in 2005. ESPNU began in March 2005. In the late 2000s, networks devoted to a single conference (e.g. Big Ten Network, MountainWest Sports Network) or team (Longhorn Network) began to appear.

Regional cable networks have long devoted coverage to one or two conferences. The Pac-12 and Big 12 have had deals with FSN since 1996, which airs games on its regional family of networks. As noted above, Fox Sports 1 and ESPN have also acquired the rights to certain games. The Mountain West Conference entered into an arrangement with CBS Sports Network and Comcast that developed the "MountainWest Sports Network" or "the mtn" that was devoted to broadcasting the league's games. The contract also placed eight MWC football games and five men's basketball games along with the MWC men's and women's basketball tournament championships on Versus (now NBC Sports Network). MountainWest Sports Network ceased operations on May 31, 2012. The Big Ten also has a similar regional network, with the Big Ten Network having made its debut in August 2007. The Texas Longhorns debuted the Longhorn Network in the fall of 2011, and the Pac-12 debuted the Pac-12 Network and Pac-12 Digital Network in fall of 2012. While it is not a national network, the Western Athletic Conference and Learfield Sports started the WAC Sports Network in 2010 to broadcast games to local affiliates.

Some Division III college football games are locally shown live or on tape on public-access television channels in the community in which the home team's campus is located.

=== Syndication ===
Historically, broadcast syndication networks have provided an additional outlet for college football telecasts. This began with outlets such as TVS Television Network and Mizlou Television Network, each of which began with bowl games until the 1984 decentralization. Later efforts included Raycom Sports (1979 to 2019), Jefferson Pilot Sports (1984 to 2007, later Lincoln Financial Media), ESPN Plus (not to be confused with the current Internet service by that name) and SportsFever Television Network, which predominantly focused on smaller universities in Pennsylvania. These networks syndicated games to broadcast stations and regional sports networks on a market-by-market basis. Many conferences also run their own syndicated network; included in these are the Sun Belt Conference and the Western Athletic Conference who run the Sun Belt Network and the WAC Sports Network.

Sinclair Broadcast Group, in 2014, launched the American Sports Network, which includes broadcasts of Division I FBS and FCS games across its properties. Conference USA, the Colonial Athletic Association, the Big South Conference, the Southern Conference, Southland Conference and Patriot League are part of ASN's package; the league also carries Mid-American Conference games through a sub-licensing deal with ESPN that allows Sinclair's local stations to carry their hometown college teams (for example, Buffalo Bulls college football was on Sinclair's WNYO). ASN was integrated into the multiplatform network Stadium in the 2017 offseason; in 2023, Sinclair divested its stake in Stadium and shut down its broadcast and cable presences.

Internet television has largely superseded the syndication networks.

=== Canada ===
Canadian university football has had some national coverage of regular season games by terrestrial networks over the last 30 years, but the vast majority of broadcasts are on community channels, community TV networks or sports specialty channels. This is in part due to the sport's structure in Canada, where it is divided strictly into regional conferences and inter-conference play is much rarer than in the United States, reducing the sport's national appeal.

Coverage of U.S. college football is available to an extent in Canada; individual U.S. stations are available over-the-air and on television providers, Big Ten Network and CBS Sports Network can be carried by Canadian television providers, while the networks of TSN often simulcast games aired by ESPN networks (ESPN owns a minority stake in TSN).

Two of the country's four conferences (OUA and Canada West) distribute telecasts via Internet television, although the quality of these broadcasts is often significantly below that of a professional telecast (typically involving airing the team's radio broadcast over a single-camera feed of the game).

==== Ontario ====
In the early years of TSN during the late 1980s and early 1990s, the network broadcast some regular season games along with the OUAA or OQIFC finals.

Hamilton-based CHCH carried Ontario (OUA) university football games (typically involving the hometown McMaster Marauders) through the 1990s until 2001. From 2003 to 2013, The Score had offered a Saturday game of the week and the Yates Cup under the brand OUA University Rush. After The Score was acquired by Sportsnet and became Sportsnet 360, the company canceled its OUA coverage due to low ratings, and no other broadcaster picked up the rights. In 2015, OUA reached an agreement with CHCH to carry the OUA playoffs in a multi-year deal, one that survived the station's bankruptcy later that year. CITY-TV, which like Sportsnet is owned by Rogers Communications, ran a four-game trial run of OUA regular season games (three of which involved the OUA) in 2016.

A series of community TV stations carry games throughout Ontario. Rogers outlets in Ottawa, Guelph, Kitchener-Waterloo and London broadcast games. TV Cogeco outlets in Windsor, Hamilton and Kingston also broadcast games. Kingston broadcasts of Queen's Gaels football are tape delayed for same day broadcast, while all other games are distributed live.

In 2025, OUA signed an agreement with Visaic (which also handles online streaming of the professional United States-based Indoor Football League) to move the OUA's football telecasts (as well as hockey and basketball) behind a paywall.

==== Quebec (and national Francophone) ====
RSEQ games are broadcast nationally in French on Radio Canada on a weekly basis, including the playoffs and the Dunsmore Cup in the 2011 and 2012 seasons. The contract is up for renewal in 2013.

Previously, RDS broadcast a game of the week package during the regular season. The rights for the Uteck Bowl, Mitchell Bowl and Vanier Cup belonged to RDS in 2011 and 2012. For 2013 onward, Radio Canada carried the national playoffs nationwide.

==== Atlantic Canada ====
In the AUS, Eastlink had a long-standing agreement to carry a game of the week up to and including the Loney Bowl which expired in 2014. The games have since been carried on Bell Alliant TV1.

==== Western Canada ====
In 2017, Canada West will broadcast a game of the week on SaskTel throughout Saskatchewan. Games produced by SaskTel will be shared by Telus in BC and Alberta and Bell-MTS in Manitoba to 1.5 million customers.

In the early years of TSN during the late 1980s and early 1990s, the network broadcast some regular season games along with the Canada West final.

Games in Canada West games were carried throughout the Shaw TV system to 2.7 million subscribers through most regions of Western Canada and parts of Northern Ontario. In southern and central Saskatchewan the broadcasts are shared with Access Communications customers. Krown Produce Canada West Football on Shaw was available from 2006 to 2016.

Since 2010, the games have been available to 790,000 Shaw Direct subscribers nationally on channels 299 and 499.

In 2012, Shaw simulcast the games in anamorphic HD for free access on HD 303 on their systems.

Shaw lost the rights to the Canada West Championship when the conference reached an agreement with MRX and Associates to broadcast the final on TSN in 2011 and 2012. Shaw regained the Hardy Trophy no later than the 2014 season, after TSN abandoned Canadian university football broadcasts.

Canada West renewed a three-year agreement with Shaw TV before the 2012 season. In 2015, Canada West expanded its coverage nationwide with an agreement with Global Television Network, a sister company to Shaw.

There were also local broadcasts produced for Manitoba Bisons home games by Shaw TV Winnipeg, and Regina Rams games by Access.

Shaw also produced a weekly, 30-minute CIS highlight and features show called the Krown Canadian University Countdown.

==== National (anglophone) ====
The Vanier Cup has had a wide and varied history on Canadian TV.

In the early 1970s, CBC Television broadcast the game, eventually returning decades later to carry the 55th Vanier Cup in 2019. CBC Sports also simulcast American college football broadcasts on a sporadic basis from 1966 to 2005. From the mid-1970s through to the mid-1980s the CTV Network broadcast the national final. TSN gained broadcast rights to the final in the late 1980s. On occasion, the network would broadcast a conference game nationally, but would mainly stick with conference finals, national semifinals (a.k.a. bowl games) and the national final.

TSN lost the rights to The Score in 2006 and 2007 for national bowl games and the Vanier Cup, but regained them between the 2008 and 2012 seasons. In the latter five seasons, TSN used its exclusive rights deal with the Canadian Football League to cross-promote the Vanier Cup as part of a broader championship weekend with the Grey Cup, the CFL championship; the cross-promotion was a success, with over 500,000 viewers watching the 2011 and 2012 Vanier Cups.

In May 2013, CIS, since renamed U Sports, signed a six-year agreement with Rogers Sportsnet to carry the Uteck Bowl, Mitchell Bowl and Vanier Cup. As a standalone event and the only substantial football on Sportsnet (rival TSN owns exclusive NFL and CFL rights in addition to its extensive U.S. college football slate), the Vanier Cup has fared far more poorly; the 2017 Vanier Cup only drew 168,000, down almost three-fourths from 2011, when 665,000 viewers saw the game. Non-Vanier Cup games fared even more poorly; the 2014 playoff games drew 80,000 and 120,000 viewers (compared to 200,000 for the Vanier Cup that year), while that year's regular season slate drew only 28,000 per game, a number so low that Sportsnet could not justify the cost (about $84,000 per game at the time) to produce the regular season contests. By 2018, the playoff numbers had fallen to 39,000 viewers for the Uteck Bowl and 66,000 for the Mitchell Bowl; the Uteck Bowl has been harmed by non-competitiveness, as Quebec has defeated Atlantic in 11 consecutive Uteck Bowls.

=== UK ===
In the United Kingdom, DAZN and Sky Sports hold the rights to air American college football. DAZN air roughly 10 games a week of ABC and ESPN games (usually SEC matchups) live via simulcast as well as College GameDay live. They also offer archived replays of select games of the week and College GameDay replays. Sky Sports hold the rights to broadcast a small number of exclusively Notre Dame Fighting Irish games live from a U.S. simulcast (usually NBC, as Sky Sports is affiliated with Comcast, who are affiliated with NBC).

== Conference affiliations by home team ==
All conferences, games and teams are Bowl Subdivision teams unless otherwise noted.

=== Broadcast network ===
- ABC: ACC, American, Big 12, SEC, championship games (ACC, American, Big 12 and SEC), and bowl games including Citrus Bowl and College Football Playoff
- CBS: Big Ten, Mountain West, Pac-12, championship games (Big Ten in 2024 and 2028, and Pac-12), Commander-in-Chief's Trophy games (include Army-Navy), and Sun Bowl
- Fox: Big 12, Big Ten, Mountain West, championship games (Big Ten in 2026 and odd-numbered years, and Mountain West)
- NBC: Big Ten, Notre Dame
- The CW: ACC, Mountain West, Pac-12, Arizona Bowl, Holiday Bowl and Poinsettia Bowl

=== Cable/regional/streaming ===
- ACC Network: ACC
- Big Ten Network: Big Ten
- CBS Sports Network: Army, C-USA (including championship game), MAC, Mountain West, Pac-12, Navy, UConn, and Hula Bowl
- ESPN networks (ESPN, ESPN2, ESPNU, ESPNews and ESPN+): ACC, American, Big 12, C-USA, MAC, SEC, Sun Belt, championship games (MAC and Sun Belt) and most bowl games including College Football Playoff
- FS1: Big 12, Big Ten and Mountain West
- Mountain West Digital Network: Mountain West
- NFL Network: East–West Shrine Bowl, NFLPA Collegiate Bowl and Senior Bowl
- Peacock and NBCSN: Big Ten and Notre Dame
- SEC Network: SEC
- TNT: Big 12 and College Football Playoff
- USA: Pac-12

=== FCS and others ===
- ABC: Celebration Bowl (FCS) and FCS Championship Game
- Aspire: Select games from the SWAC (FCS) and CIAA (D-II, including league championship)
- ESPN networks (ESPN, ESPN2, ESPNU, ESPNews and ESPN+): Big Sky (FCS), Ivy (FCS), MEAC (FCS), MVFC (FCS), NEC (FCS), OVC (FCS), Patriot League (FCS), SLC (FCS), SoCon (FCS), SWAC (FCS), UAC (FCS), Turkey Day Classic (FCS/D-II), SWAC Championship Game, FCS tournament, Gulf South (D-II), D-II Championship Game, Secretaries' Cup (D-III), D-III Championship Game, KCAC (NAIA), NAIA Championship
- FloSports: CAA (FCS), SAC (D-II), NE-10 (D-II) and SIAC (D-II)
- HBCU Go: SWAC (FCS)
- Hudl: Middle Atlantic, MIAA, PSAC, Empire 8, Little East, RMAC, NSIC, GLVC, Centennial Conference, WIAC, NCAC, ODAC, Presidents', CACC, CIAA, Sprint, NCCAA
- Image Video: Mount Union (D-III)
- NBC: Bayou Classic (FCS)
- NEC Front Row: NEC (FCS)
- News Channel Nebraska: University of Nebraska at Kearney
- NFL Network: HBCU Legacy Bowl (FCS)
- SWAC TV: SWAC (FCS)

In contrast to the National Football League, which before 2014 used the visiting team's conference affiliation to determine who broadcasts afternoon games, college football telecasts are assigned based on the home team's conference affiliation.

=== Canada ===
There are four conferences in Canada, plus a national playoff. Regional and national coverage in 2019:

- SaskTel and Telus TV/Bell-MTS: Canada West (both regular season and Hardy Trophy)
- TVA Sports: French: RSEQ, French-language coverage of the Vanier Cup
- Bell Alliant TV1: AUS
- CHCH TV: OUA (select regular season games and Yates Cup)
- TSN: American college football broadcast simulcasts from the ESPN networks

CBS Sports Network is also available in Canada (the only cable sports service from the U.S. to be carried in the country), as are most U.S. broadcast networks. National semifinals and final managed by U Sports

- CBC: Vanier Cup

== Televised games ==
=== Annual televised games ===
Some games are traditionally played on a specific date (often a holiday), and are nationally televised every single year. These include:

- Auburn and Alabama – Known as "The Iron Bowl", has generally been the last game of the regular season. Since 2007, the game has been scheduled for either the Friday or Saturday after Thanksgiving.
- Notre Dame and Michigan – Played in September in all but six seasons since 1978. Every one of these games has been on national network television, except the 1980 game (won by Notre Dame, 29-27, on a game-ending 51-yard field goal by Harry Oliver). The 1982 showdown was the first night game in the history of Notre Dame Stadium, with the use of portable lights from Musco Lighting, and was televised in prime time on ABC. The 1988 and 1990 games at Notre Dame were prime time telecasts on CBS, with both won by Notre Dame. The 2011 game, the first night game ever at Michigan Stadium and won by Michigan, was televised nationally by ESPN. The 2014 game was the last of the annual series due to Notre Dame's current commitment to schedule five ACC schools each season, plus the Big Ten's move to a nine-game conference schedule starting in 2016. The teams played a one-off renewal, again in September, in 2018. As this game was at Notre Dame, it was televised nationally by NBC, which has had the contract to televise Notre Dame home games since 1991.
- Ohio State and Michigan – Also referred to as "The Game" is traditionally played the third Saturday of every November and broadcast on ABC through the 2016 season. With the Big Ten adding a bye week, the game was moved to the Saturday after Thanksgiving in 2010. Beginning with the 2017 season, Fox will broadcast the game at Noon on an (expected) annual basis.
- West Virginia and Pittsburgh (Backyard Brawl) – Usually played towards the end of the football season and always on national television. In the past, the Backyard Brawl games were on ABC, CBS, ESPN and ESPN2. The rivalry ended for the time being with West Virginia's move to the Big 12 before the 2012 college football season.
- Tennessee vs. Alabama –Known as the "Third Saturday in October". This game has been played between the two schools on or around the same day of every year since 1901. Recently it has been either the third or fourth Saturday of October, depending on the calendar.
- Texas and Oklahoma (Red River Shootout) – Played during the State Fair of Texas in Dallas on the second Saturday of October and broadcast on ABC. The 2009 game was moved back a week to the third Saturday in October, and the 2010 game was moved up to the first Saturday in October.
- USC and Notre Dame – USC–ND has had a national television audience every year since 1986, with the exception of 2002 when the game was a split-national telecast with Florida–Florida State. Notre Dame hosts the game in odd years in mid-October and it is aired on NBC, and USC hosts the game in even years on the Saturday after Thanksgiving and can be aired by various networks depending on the Big Ten contract stipulations.
- Florida and Florida State – Usually played on the Saturday of Thanksgiving weekend except 2020, during odd years the game is played in Gainesville, and in even years in Tallahassee.. In 2022, the game aired on Black Friday for the first time, in primetime.
- Texas A&M–Texas – Played on the day after Thanksgiving and televised annually on ABC through 2007. In 2008, Texas A&M vs. Texas was played on Thanksgiving night in Austin, and in 2009 was played on Thanksgiving night in College Station, with ESPN telecasting both games. The 2010 game in Austin was again played on Thanksgiving night. The game was not played following A&M's 2012 move to the Southeastern Conference, but was re-upped following Texas’ move to the SEC in 2024.
- LSU and Arkansas – Known as "The Battle for the Golden Boot." Played on the day after Thanksgiving and broadcast on CBS from 1996 to 2008. The game was moved back a day to Saturday due to the Iron Bowl moving to the Friday slot for 2009 and 2010, but was broadcast by ESPN and CBS, respectively. CBS once again aired the game on the day after Thanksgiving in 2011, 2012 and 2013. LSU and Arkansas began playing earlier in November in 2014, but the teams will end their regular seasons against one another in 2026.
- LSU-Texas A&M - Played on Thanksgiving weekend from 2014-23 and televised by ESPN or ESPN2. The games in College Station in 2014 and 2016 were played on Thanksgiving night, owing to the Aggies' former tradition of playing Texas on Thanksgiving. LSU refused to move the games in Baton Rouge to Thanksgiving (no game at Tiger Stadium has been played on a Thursday since 1973), keeping them on Saturday.
- Arkansas-Missouri - Known as the "Battle Line Rivalry", it was played on the Friday after Thanksgiving from 2014-25
- Army–Navy Game – generally played on the last weekend of the regular season and broadcast on CBS since 1996. Since 2009, the game has been played on the second Saturday in December, and is the only scheduled FBS game that weekend except 2020.
- Kentucky–Louisville - Known as the "Governor's Cup", this game is played at the end of the season. The in-state-rivals formerly opened the season against each other, but since Louisville joined the ACC in 2014, the game has been held on the last week before the ACC and SEC championship games. This specific weekend features three other ACC–SEC in-state rivalries in Clemson–South Carolina, Florida–Florida State, and Georgia–Georgia Tech.
- USC and UCLA – played during the last week of the regular season (2004–2008), when the game was broadcast on ABC between the ACC Championship Game and the Big 12 Championship Game. (NOTE: For the 2009 season USC played their final game against Arizona, but USC-UCLA was again each team's final game in 2010.) The carrier network is determined by the Big Ten television contracts.
- BYU and Utah – Known as "The Holy War" and as the "Deseret First Duel." The game was typically played the week before Thanksgiving until the 2011 season, when Utah moved to the Pac-12 and BYU became a football independent. The game was broadcast by ABC, ESPN, ESPN2, or ESPN Plus before 2007 and was simulcast on Mtn. and CBS Sports Network from 2007 to 2010. The game returned to the ESPN family of networks beginning in 2011, and could be seen on one of the Fox family of networks in even-numbered years. For the 2011 and 2012 seasons the game took place during the third week of the season. From 2013 forward, the game takes place between September 29 and October 5, depending on what day the first Sunday in October falls on.
- Grambling and Southern – Known as the Bayou Classic, the Grambling-Southern rivalry airs annually on NBCSN on the last Saturday afternoon in November (i.e., the Saturday following Thanksgiving). It is the only black college football classic, and until the game moved from NBC in 2015, was the only non-FBS college football game to air regularly on a nationwide broadcast television network.

==== Bowl games ====
- Rose Bowl – Annually broadcast since the 1952 Rose Bowl. Traditionally held on New Year's Day along with the Rose Parade; however, after joining the Bowl Championship Series, the 2002 game was played January 3 and the 2006 game was played January 4 due to the Rose Bowl being the national championship game. NBC was the longtime home of the Rose Bowl until the late 1980s, when ABC took over. ABC's final Rose Bowl was the 2010 game, and the network aired the BCS Championship Game from the Rose Bowl on January 7, 2010. ESPN began televising the game in 2011.
- Orange Bowl – Traditionally held on New Year's Day. It was a New Year's night staple for many years on NBC, with NBC's last telecast being the 1995 game. CBS aired the game for three years, followed by ABC for eight years, and Fox for four years, with 2010 being the last Orange Bowl to air on Fox. ESPN began televising the game in 2011.
- Sugar Bowl – Traditionally held on New Year's Day. Its traditional time slot was early afternoon and was first telecast by the DuMont Network in 1953 and then by ABC from 1954 to 1958. From 1959 until 1969 NBC broadcast the game as a part of its New Year's Day trio of the Sugar, Rose and then Orange. ABC returned in 1970 and for 1972 convinced the Sugar Bowl committee to move the game to primetime on New Year's Eve where it remained through 1975. ABC aired the game up until 2006 when Fox purchased the rights for the BCS Bowl games through 2010. ESPN began televising the game in 2011.
- Cotton Bowl Classic – Traditionally held on New Year's Day. CBS was the long-time home of the Cotton Bowl Classic, airing it up through 1992, and again from 1996 to 1998. NBC aired the game from 1993 to 1995, and Fox aired the game from 1999 to 2014. The game has been played on January 2 multiple times in recent years, as was the case in both 2009 and 2010. The 2011 game aired in primetime for the first time ever, on Friday, January 7. ESPN has aired the game since January 15 as part of the College Football Playoff package (the Cotton Bowl is a CFP semifinal once every three years and is an "access" bowl in the other two).

=== BCS games ===
The Bowl Championship Series, which operated from 1998 through the 2013 season, was driven from the start by television revenue. In 2007, the Fox Broadcasting Company started broadcasting all the BCS games with the exception of the Rose Bowl. ABC previously aired two full cycles of the BCS between 1998 and 2006. Before this, CBS aired the Bowl Coalition and the Bowl Alliance, with the exception of the Sugar Bowl from 1995 to 1997. The Rose Bowl aired on ABC from 1989 to 2010. All BCS games shifted to cable in 2010–11 as ESPN began a four-year deal.

=== College Football Playoff ===
The College Football Playoff replaced the BCS starting with the 2014 season. ESPN acquired rights to the entire CFP package, consisting of six bowl games and the College Football Playoff National Championship, through the 2025 season.

== Announcers ==
=== United States ===
This is a listing of primary national announcers for college football television broadcasts in the United States. Additional talent may be used for overflow broadcasts as well as substitution purposes for primary announcers.

==== ABC/ESPN Networks (2026 season) ====
1. Chris Fowler/Kirk Herbstreit/Holly Rowe/Laura Rutledge- most weeks(ABC/ESPN)
2. Sean McDonough/Greg McElroy/Katie George (ABC/ESPN)
3. Joe Tessitore or Tom Hart/Jesse Palmer/Kris Budden or Taylor McGregor (ABC/ESPN)
4. Bob Wischusen or Roy Philpott /Louis Riddick or Brock Osweiler /Stormy Buonantony (ESPN/ABC)
5. Dave Pasch or Wes Durham/Dusty Dvoracek/Taylor McGregor (ESPN/ABC)
6. Tom Hart or Justin Kutcher/Roddy Jones/Quint Kessenich (ESPN/ABC)
7. Matt Barrie/Chase Daniel/Paul Carcaterra (ESPN College Football Thursday Primetime)
8. Mike Monaco/Jordan Rodgers/Dana Boyle (ESPN/ESPN2 College Football Friday Primetime)
9. Roy Philpott or Jay Alter/Brock Osweiler or Tom Luginbill/Sherree Burruss (ESPN Saturday Late Night)
10. Jay Alter or Chuckie Kempf or Mike Couzens/Tom Luginbillor Dustin Fox/Lauren Sisler or Sherree Burruss (ESPN2)
11. Lowell Galindo/Kirk Morrison/Dawn Davenport (ESPN2)
12. Anish Shroff/Andre Ware or Jay Walker/Morgan Uber (ESPN2)
13. Clay Matvick/Rocky Boiman (ESPN2/ESPNU)
14. Chuckie Kempf/Dustin Fox (ESPN2/ESPNU)
15. Courtney Lyle/Rene Ingoglia (ESPN2/ESPNU)
16. Ted Emrich/Fozzy Whittaker (ESPN2/ESPNU)
17. Jason Ross/Tyoka Jackson (ESPN2/ESPNU)

==== Fox/FS1/FS2 (2026 season) ====
1. Gus Johnson/Joel Klatt/Jenny Taft (Fox Big Noon Saturday)
2. Connor Onion/Robert Griffin III/Alexa Landestoy (Fox/FS1)
3. Tim Brando or Noah Reed/Devin Gardner/Josh Sims (Fox/FS1)
4. Jack Kizer or Noah Reed/Mark Helfrich (Fox/FS1)
5. Dan Hellie or Noah Reed or Carlo Jiménez or Chris Myers/Robert Smith (FS1/Fox)
6. Eric Collins or Connor Onion or Carlo Jiménez/Spencer Tillman (FS1)
7. Noah Reed or Carlo Jiménez/Petros Papadakis (FS1)

==== CBS/CBSSN (2026 season) ====
1. Brad Nessler/Charles Davis/Jenny Dell (The Home Depot Big Ten on CBS)
2. Rich Waltz/Adam Breneman/Brian Kelly/Jordan Giorgio

– Additional Play-by Play Announcers: Chris Lewis, Jason Knapp, John Sadak, Justin Kutcher, Alex Del Barrio, Jordan Kent, Jack Gordon

– Additional Color Analysts: Brian Kelly, Randy Cross, Robert Turbin, Ben DiNucci, Doug Pederson, Taylor McHargue, Emory Hunt

– Additional Sideline Reporters: Hailey Sutton, Tina Cervasio, Brandon Baylor, Jaclyn DeAugustino, Ben DiNucci

==== USA (2026 season) ====
1. Nate Gatter/Ryan Leaf/Lauren Green
2. Ted Robinson/Darius Walker/Dalen Cuff
3. Guy Haberman/Alex Brink/Kate Harrison

==== NBC (2026 season) ====
1. Noah Eagle or Paul Burmeister/Todd Blackledge/Kathryn Tappen/Caroline Pineda (Big Ten Saturday Night/Notre Dame Football on NBC)
2. Jason Benetti/Jason Garrett/Caroline Pineda (Notre Dame Football on NBC)

- Additional Play-by-Play Announcers: Dave Flemming

- Additional Analysts: Yogi Roth, Matt Cassel, Ian Book

- Additional Sideline Reporter: Zora Stephenson, Ashley ShahAhmadi, Lewis Johnson

==== CW (2026 season) ====
1. Thom Brennaman or Rick Allen/Jason Cabinda/Wes Bryant (ACC)
2. Rick Allen or Chris Fisher/Will Blackmon/Michael Bumpus or Nigel Burton (Pac–12)
3. Jack McMullen or Chris Fisher/Cody Kessler/Marshall Newhouse or Bryan Walters (MW)
4. Chris Fisher/Isaiah Stanback/Bryan Walters (Pac–12/MW)

==== TNT (2026 season) ====
1. J. B. Long/Mike Golic Jr./Allie LaForce or Coy Wire or Jared Greenberg (Big 12)

==== BTN (2026 season) ====
- Play-by-Play Announcers: Jeff Levering, Mark Followill, Jason Horowitz, Chris Vosters, Lisa Byington, Wayne Randazzo, A. J. Kanell, Joe Beninati, Cory Provus

- Analysts: Jake Butt, Rhett Lewis, Anthony Herron, Matt Millen, Brock Vereen, Marcel Reece, Tanner Morgan, Jared Thomas, Ryan Kerrigan, Kenjon Barner and Brett Hundley

- Sideline Reporters: Alyssa Charleston, Brooke Fletcher, Caroline Hendershot, Melanie Ricks, Dannie Rogers, Kenjon Barner

==== SEC Network (2026 season) ====
1. Matt Schumacker/Aaron Murray/Taylor Davis (SEC Network Primetime)
2. Taylor Zarzour/Matt Stinchcomb/Michella Chester
3. Dave Neal/Cole Cubelic/Tori Petry

==== ACC Network (2026 season) ====
1. Wes Durham or Justin Kutcher/Max Browne/Madison Fitzpatrick (ACC Network Primetime)
2. Jorge Sedano/Rodney McLeod/Kendra Douglas or Annabelle Hasselbeck
3. Roxy Bernstein or Jorge Sedano/Dave Clawson/Madison Hock
4. Cooper Boardman/Charles Arbuckle/Ashley Stroehlein
5. Doug Sherman/Forrest Conoly
6. Robert Lee/Mo Hasan

=== Bowl announcers ===
==== Rose Bowl ====
- List of Rose Bowl Game broadcasters

==== Orange Bowl ====
- List of Orange Bowl broadcasters

=== Canada ===
==== Krown Produce Canada West Football on Shaw ====
1. Jim Mullin/Laurence Nixon or Jesse Lumsden or Daved Benefield

==== OUA University Rush on The Score ====
1. Simon Bennett/Donnovan Bennett

==== RSEQ football sur SRC ====
1. Jean St-Onge/Jacques Dussault

==== Subway AUS Football on Eastlink TV ====
1. Dan Robertson

==== SIC sur RDS ====
1. Pierre Vercheval

== See also ==
- Men's college basketball on television
