= College football on radio =

College football on radio includes the radio broadcasting of college football games, as well as pre- and post-game reports, analysis, and human-interest stories.

== Events leading up to radio broadcasts ==
In 1911, more than 1,000 people gathered in downtown Lawrence, Kansas, to watch a mechanical reproduction of the 1911 Kansas vs. Missouri football game while it was being played. A Western Union telegraph wire was set up direct from Columbia, Missouri. A group of people then would announce the results of the previous play and used a large model of a football playing field to show the results. Those in attendance cheered as though they were watching the game live, including the school's legendary Rock Chalk, Jayhawk cheer.

== Radio broadcasts ==
College football games have been broadcast since at least 1919, including the Wesleyan at New York University contest on November 18 of that year, carried by Lee de Forest's experimental station, 2XG in New York City. The first game broadcast nationwide happened the three years later, with the 1922 Princeton vs. Chicago football game. The game had Grantland Rice dub Princeton the "Team of Destiny."

Today, virtually every college football game (at least from Division III on up; junior college, club/junior varsity squads and sprint football teams tend not to have radio coverage) is broadcast on the radio in their local market and many are broadcast nationally. Division III teams may rely on student-run radio stations (or, sometimes, college-owned public radio stations) as their only broadcast outlet, but Division I teams generally garner enough interest to be broadcast not only on commercial radio, but on a network of stations covering a wide region. These regions vary in size and can reflect not only the geography of a fanbase but geographies of US states and culture regions. Other coverage includes local broadcasts of weekly coach's programs. Sports USA Radio Network, Westwood One, Compass Media Networks, ESPN Radio, Touchdown Radio, and Nevada Sports Network all distribute college football broadcasts on a nationwide basis. Additionally Notre Dame and BYU have their games distributed nationally through IMG.

Radio broadcasts of Canadian university football are not as consistent. There is generally no national radio broadcasting of university football, much in the same way that the sport is not nationally (or internationally) televised. Teams in mid-sized markets tend to be broadcast on radio, while those in the largest cities or suburbs (where the sport has to compete with much higher-profile professional sports) typically do not.

On the Internet, Division I schools tend to place audio streaming of their radio broadcasts behind paywalls. Lower divisions and Canadian teams typically allow their affiliates and/or flagship stations to broadcast the game online without any additional fees.

== List of National Radio Broadcast teams ==
(For 2020)

- Compass Media Networks: T.J. Rives, Bill Rosinski, or Kevin Ray & Tiki Barber, Curtis Conway, or Chad Brown
- ESPN Radio: Sean Kelley or Marc Kestecher & Barrett Jones
- Touchdown Radio: Brett Dolan, J.P. Shadrick, or Jim Szoke & Gino Torretta, Sage Rosenfels, Charles Arbuckle, Danan Hughes, or Clint Stoerner
- Westwood One: Brandon Gaudin, Ted Emrich, or John Sadak & Derek Rackley, Chuck Long, James Laurinaitis, or Babe Laufenberg
