= Patricia T. O'Conner =

Author of books about the English language

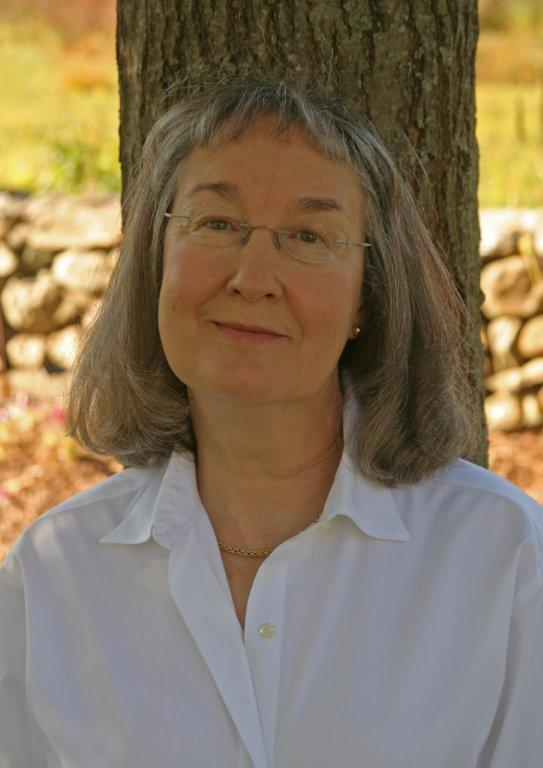
- Born: February 19, 1949 (age 77); Des Moines, Iowa, U.S.
- Education: Grinnell College (BA); University of Minnesota
- Occupation: Author
- Spouse: Stewart Kellerman

Patricia T. O'Conner (born February 19, 1949) is the author of five books about the English language. A former staff editor at The New York Times Book Review, she has appeared regularly as a language commentator for WNYC and Iowa Public Radio. She has written extensively for The New York Times, including book reviews, On Language columns, and articles for the op-ed page and the Week in Review section. Her work has also appeared in Smithsonian, The Paris Review, the Literary Review (London), and other publications.

A native of Des Moines, Iowa, she graduated from Grinnell College in 1971 with a BA in philosophy and received an honorary degree from Grinnell in 2006. She did graduate work in urban journalism at the University of Minnesota, Minneapolis, before beginning her career as a reporter and editor in 1973. After several years at The Des Moines Register and The Wall Street Journal, she joined the New York Times in 1982.

She and Stewart Kellerman, her husband and co-author of several books and articles, answer questions about the English language on The Grammarphobia Blog.

== Publications ==
- Woe Is I: The Grammarphobe's Guide to Better English in Plain English (Riverhead, 4th ed., 2019, ISBN 978-0525533054)
- Origins of the Specious: Myths and Misconceptions of the English Language, co-authored by Kellerman (Random House, 2009, ISBN 978-0-8129-7810-0)
- Woe Is I Jr.: The Younger Grammarphobe's Guide to Better English in Plain English (Putnam, 2007, ISBN 978-0-399-24331-8)
- You Send Me: Getting It Right When You Write Online, co-authored by Kellerman (Harcourt, 2002, ISBN 978-0-15-602733-5)
- Words Fail Me: What Everyone Who Writes Should Know About Writing (Harcourt, 1999, ISBN 978-0-15-601087-0)
- The Reader Over Your Shoulder, by Robert Graves with Alan Hodge; new introduction by Patricia T. O’Conner (Seven Stories Press, 2018, ISBN 978-1-60980-733-7)
