= Stewart Kellerman =

American writer and journalist

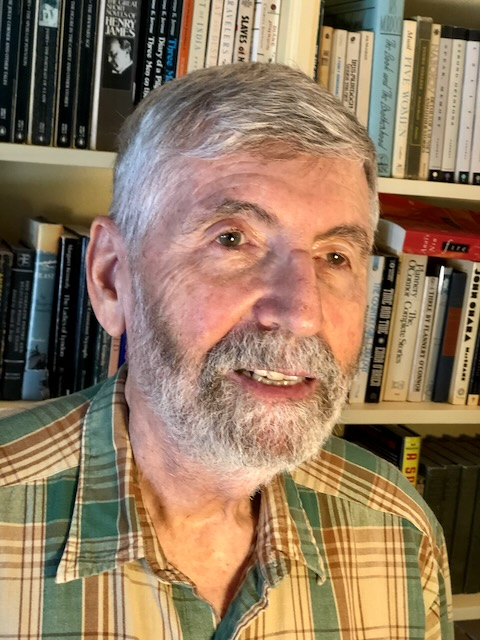
- Born: December 13, 1941 (age 84); New York City
- Education: Columbia University
- Occupations: Author; journalist; blogger
- Spouse: Patricia T. O'Conner

Stewart Kellerman (born December 13, 1941) is an American author, journalist, and blogger who has reported on wars in Asia, Latin America, and the Middle East. A former editor at The New York Times and foreign correspondent for United Press International, he has covered conflicts in Vietnam, Cambodia, Laos, Bangladesh, Argentina, Uruguay, Israel, and the Arab world.

Kellerman earned a bachelor's degree from Columbia University in 1964 and was the 1972–73 Edward R. Murrow Press Fellow at the Council on Foreign Relations, where he focused on American policy with China and the Soviet Union. During his career with UPI, he wrote feature stories from the battle zones in addition to news dispatches. A feature written on Christmas Eve 1971, about a party for the children of South Vietnamese soldiers, became the foreword to Alan Dawson's book 55 Days: The Fall of South Vietnam (1977).

He has also written a comic novel about growing old in America, and has co-authored books and articles about the English language with his wife, the language commentator Patricia T. O'Conner. He has written book reviews and articles on cultural subjects for the Times. He and O'Conner write about language on The Grammarphobia Blog, where they have answered nearly 4,000 questions from readers since 2006.

== Publications ==
=== Books ===
- Swan Song: A Novel (Rushwater Press, 2019). ISBN 978-0-9801-53286
- Origins of the Specious: Myths and Misconceptions of the English Language, co-authored by O'Conner (Random House, 2010). ISBN 978-0-8129-7810-0
- You Send Me: Getting It Right When You Write Online, co-authored by O'Conner (Harcourt, 2002). ISBN 978-0-15-602733-5
- 55 Days: The Fall of South Vietnam, by Alan Dawson. Foreword by Stewart Kellerman. (Prentice-Hall, 1977.) ISBN 9780133144765
