= Molly McGrath =

American sportscaster and studio host (born 1989)

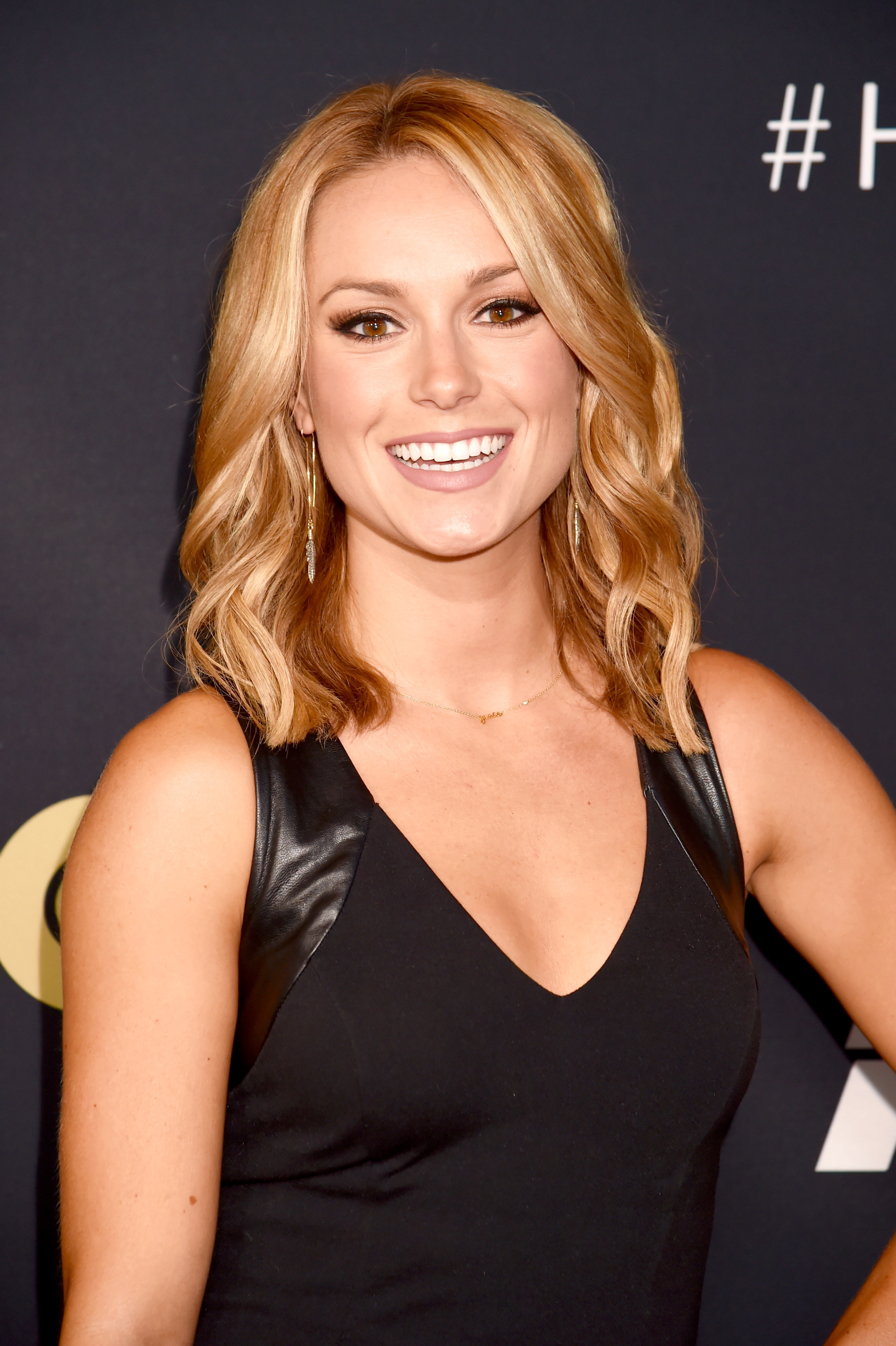
- McGrath in 2016
- Born: Molly Anne McGrath; June 6, 1989 (age 37); San Francisco, California, U.S.
- Education: Boston College
- Occupations: Sportscaster, Studio host
- Years active: 2011–present
- Employer(s): Fox Sports (2013–2016); ESPN (2016–present)
- Height: 5 ft 5 in (1.65 m)
- Spouse: Max Dorsch (m. 2018)
- Children: 2

Molly Anne McGrath (born June 6, 1989) is an American sportscaster and studio host who works as a sideline reporter for ESPN’s NFL and college basketball telecasts.

== Career ==
=== Early sportscasting work (2009–2013) ===
While attending Boston College, where she was a cheerleading captain, McGrath pitched the athletic director to let her interview athletes and coaches for the college’s website, BCEagles.com. These interviews helped her put together a reel which she used to help secure her first on-air job. While at BC, McGrath also interned at NESN and WHDH-TV. After graduating, McGrath worked at ESPN as a production assistant, where she logged play-by-plays, produced highlights, and other support tasks for various ESPN shows.

In 2011, McGrath was hired as a web reporter and in-arena host for the Boston Celtics. She hosted, produced, and edited daily updates, exclusive interviews and other packages for the Celtics' team website. She also hosted the show Celtics Now for Comcast SportsNet New England and served as a sideline reporter for CSNNE’s regional broadcasts.

=== Fox Sports / Battlebots (2013–2016) ===
While she was working for the Celtics, an executive at Fox Sports found clips of McGrath's work on YouTube and contacted her via Facebook about a potential job opportunity with the network. She was among several initial hires by Los Angeles–based Fox Sports 1 in the summer of 2013. Initially hired as an update anchor, McGrath quickly rose through the ranks. In 2014, she joined Mike Hill as a co-host and anchor on the daily sports highlight show, America's Pregame. In addition, McGrath also was the lead sideline reporter for Fox College Football and Fox College Basketball. She also covered games for the NFL on Fox.

In 2015, McGrath hosted the return of the revived show Battlebots on ABC, for its sixth season.

=== ESPN (2016–present) ===
In the summer of 2016, McGrath returned to ESPN as college sports sideline reporter and co-host of College Football Live. For the 2016 college football season, McGrath worked the sidelines of ESPN College Football Friday Primetime games, along with Mack Brown and Adam Amin. She also covered the sidelines for ESPN’s College Basketball telecasts. For the 2017 college football season, McGrath continued her work on the sidelines of ESPN College Football Friday Primetime games, hosted various halftime shows and episodes of College Football Live, and covered a number of bowl games such as the Orange Bowl, Outback Bowl, Texas Bowl, and Las Vegas Bowl. For the 2018 football season, McGrath covered Saturday ESPN College Football games on ESPN or ABC with Mark Jones and Dusty Dvoracek. In 2018 and 2019, McGrath covered the weekly Big Ten Super Tuesday college basketball match-up with Dave Flemming and Dan Dakich. For the 2019 football season, McGrath covered two college football games per week: ESPN College Football Thursday Primetime with Adam Amin, Matt Hasselbeck, and Pat McAfee, and ESPN/ABC Saturday games with Steve Levy, Brian Griese, and Todd McShay. She joined ESPN's coverage of the XFL (2020) on the week 2 of the season.

Starting with the 2021 college football season, McGrath was paired with Sean McDonough and Greg McElroy (formerly Todd Blackledge) throughout the season. Since 2021, McGrath has also joined Holly Rowe on the sidelines for the television broadcast of the College Football Playoff National Championship. In 2024, McGrath made her NFL draft debut, interviewing prospects following their selection on the main stage.

In addition to her football duties, McGrath continues to work as a reporter on ESPN College Basketball broadcasts, and occasionally hosts Sportscenter, Vibe Check, and College Football Live.

== Awards ==
In 2023, McGrath was nominated for Outstanding Personality/Reporter at the 44th Sports Emmy Awards. In 2025, McGrath and the entire SEC on ABC team won the Sports Emmy for Outstanding Live Series.

== Personal life ==
McGrath was born in San Francisco, California, to Deborah and Michael McGrath. Her father is of Irish ancestry and her mother is of Mexican-Spanish descent. She has an older brother, Patrick, who played football at Princeton University. Growing up in Burlingame, California, McGrath attended St. Ignatius College Preparatory and graduated in 2007. She then attended Boston College and graduated in 2011 with a Bachelor of Arts degree in Communication and Broadcast Journalism. While at BC, McGrath was captain of the cheerleading team and earned the athletic director’s award for academic excellence all four years. As of 2025, she lives in the Greater Boston area with her husband, Max Dorsch, a commercial real estate investments professional, and their two sons.
