= Sue Castorino =

American journalist

- Born: Columbus, Ohio
- Education: Northwestern University
- Occupations: businesswoman broadcast journalist news anchor reporter

Sue Castorino is founder and president of The Speaking Specialists, a communications company specializing in public speaking and media training services, located in Chicago. She was an American broadcast journalist, news anchor and reporter in Cleveland and Chicago.

== Biography ==
Sue Castorino was born Susann Kay Castorino in Columbus, Ohio and attended Northwestern University in Evanston, Illinois where she graduated in 1975 with a Bachelor of Science in Speech. As part of the Northwestern program, she completed an internship at WBBM-TV in Chicago. After a brief stint at WHTH-AM in Newark, Ohio she was named news anchor and reporter at WERE-AM in Cleveland, the city’s all-news station at that time. The station WERE had just begun an all-news radio format and was the local affiliate for the NBC network. In 1977 Castorino went on to be the morning news anchor and reporter at WWWE-AM, also known as `3WE' (now WTAM) in Cleveland. In addition, she became the first woman at that station to host Cleveland Cavaliers basketball programs and covered the Indians, Browns, and other sporting events as well as news.

From 1981 to 1986 Castorino was the afternoon news anchor at WBBM, the all-news station in Chicago owned and operated by CBS. During that time she also served as news reporter and hosted various sports programs including a weekly White Sox show. In 1983 Castorino married Randy Minkoff, who was then the United Press International Midwest sports editor.

In 1986, Castorino founded The Speaking Specialists, a woman-owned communications company specializing in public speaking, media training, issue management and voice coaching services, based in Chicago. She conducts sessions for major collegiate programs, the NFL, NBA, and Major League Baseball as well as corporate executives. Minkoff joined The Speaking Specialists in 1996 after leaving WGN Radio.

In 2000 The Speaking Specialists was awarded the contract by the United States Olympic Committee to provide media training to all of the American athletes and coaches who competed in the Summer Olympic Games in Sydney, Australia. Castorino and Minkoff have subsequently provided similar services for many of the athletes competing in the Olympic Games in the 21st century.

Castorino is a professor on the faculty of Loyola University (Chicago) School of Communication, where she teaches Public Speaking & Critical Thinking, Business and Professional Speaking, Broadcast Journalism, Ethics & Communication, and History & Issues in Journalism.

== Additional References and other sources ==
- Johns Hopkins Magazine, November 1998. When Academics Meet the Press
- Haugh, David Jun 25, 2006; Advice from the pros: Experts in human relations say it's wrong for Ozzie Guillen to blame his outbursts on cultural differences. Chicago Tribune pg. 8;
- Bell, Taylor, Oct 6, 2006; Tongue-tied? Speaking Specialists can help. Chicago Sun-Times.
- Mawicke, Megan, Dec 4, 2007; Speaking Specialists Give Athletes Media Skills, CBS2 Chicago
- Stanley, Alessandra (February 16, 2002). "NBC Trying Its Best To Be Cool". The New York Times.
- 2007 USA Track & Field Elite Athlete Handbook
