= Randy Minkoff =

Randy Minkoff is a partner in The Speaking Specialists, a communications company in Chicago, United States. Minkoff is also a reporter, writer and editor, with more than three decades of journalism experience in both print and broadcasting. He is the co-author of the book `Ron Santo: For Love of Ivy.'

== Biography ==
Randy Minkoff was born in St. Louis, Mo, and grew up in Clayton, Mo. He attended Drake University in Des Moines, Iowa, where he graduated with a bachelor’s degree in journalism in 1971. He immediately joined United Press International. Minkoff spent nearly 20 years with UPI, including a decade as the Midwest Sports Editor in Chicago. Minkoff has covered the Olympics, numerous Super Bowls, the Final Four, the World Series, and other major events. Minkoff has also served as state news editor of the UPI bureaus Iowa and Kentucky. He has interviewed thousands of personalities and newsmakers and has won several regional awards for outstanding reporting.

Minkoff also served as an official scorer for Major League Baseball and was President of the Chicago chapter of the Baseball Writers of America.

In 1988, Minkoff became the sports anchor and reporter at WGN Radio in Chicago. As a broadcaster he hosted programs with the Chicago Cubs and Chicago Bears and covered sporting events. Minkoff was anchor and host of Sports Central., and ports anchor and host of Sports Central also hosted Score 720 sports trivia game show.

In 1993 he co-authored the autobiography “Ron Santo: For Love of Ivy”, the story of the former Cub third baseman Ron Santo, his life, and his battle with diabetes.

Minkoff was a regular on “The Sportswriters” weekly radio program and also served as play-by-play announcer for DePaul University men's basketball with the late Hall of Fame coach, Ray Meyer.

In 1983, Minkoff married Sue Castorino, who was then a broadcaster at WBBM in Chicago. Castorino subsequently founded The Speaking Specialists, a communications company in Chicago specializing in public speaking and media training. At that time, the company primarily served business and corporate clients around the world.

In 1996, Minkoff joined his wife at The Speaking Specialists, where he started the sports division of the company. He and Castorino provide services for the NFL, NBA, Major League Baseball, American Olympians, and colleges and universities. Since 2009 he has served as professor on the faculty of Loyola University Chicago where he teaches sports broadcasting, broadcast journalism, ethics & communication, and news research & editing.

In 2025, Minkoff was selected  to the Clayton High School Hall of Fame

== Sources ==
1. Santo, Ron & Minkoff, Randy, 1993. For Love of Ivy The Autobiography of Ron Santo, Bonus Books,ISBN 0-929387-92-9, ISBN 978-0-929387-92-5
2. UAB Blazers, Aug. 2007, The Speaking Specialists Meet With UAB Student-Athletes
3. Johns Hopkins Magazine, November 1998. When Academics Meet the Press
4. Zobel, Alex, Aug. 2006, More athletes get media training to protect team image TCU Daily Skiff
5. Haugh, David, Jun 25, 2006; Advice from the pros: Experts in human relations say it's wrong for Ozzie Guillen to blame his outbursts on cultural differences. Chicago Tribune pg. 8;
6. Bell, Taylor, Oct 6, 2006; Tongue-tied? Speaking Specialists can help. Chicago Sun-Times.
7. Mawicke, Megan, Dec 4, 2007; Speaking Specialists Give Athletes Media Skills, CBS2Chicago
8. Stanley, Alessandra (February 16, 2002). "NBC Trying Its Best To Be Cool". The New York Times.
9. 2007 USA Track & Field Elite Athlete Handbook

== Articles ==
- Minkoff, Randy - December 23, 1999. Looking Back — Top 100 Sports Events of the 20th Century
- Minkoff, Randy - December 17, 1999. Collectors Universe Ranks the Top 100 Athletes of the Century'
