= Heather Cox =

American sports commentator (born 1970)

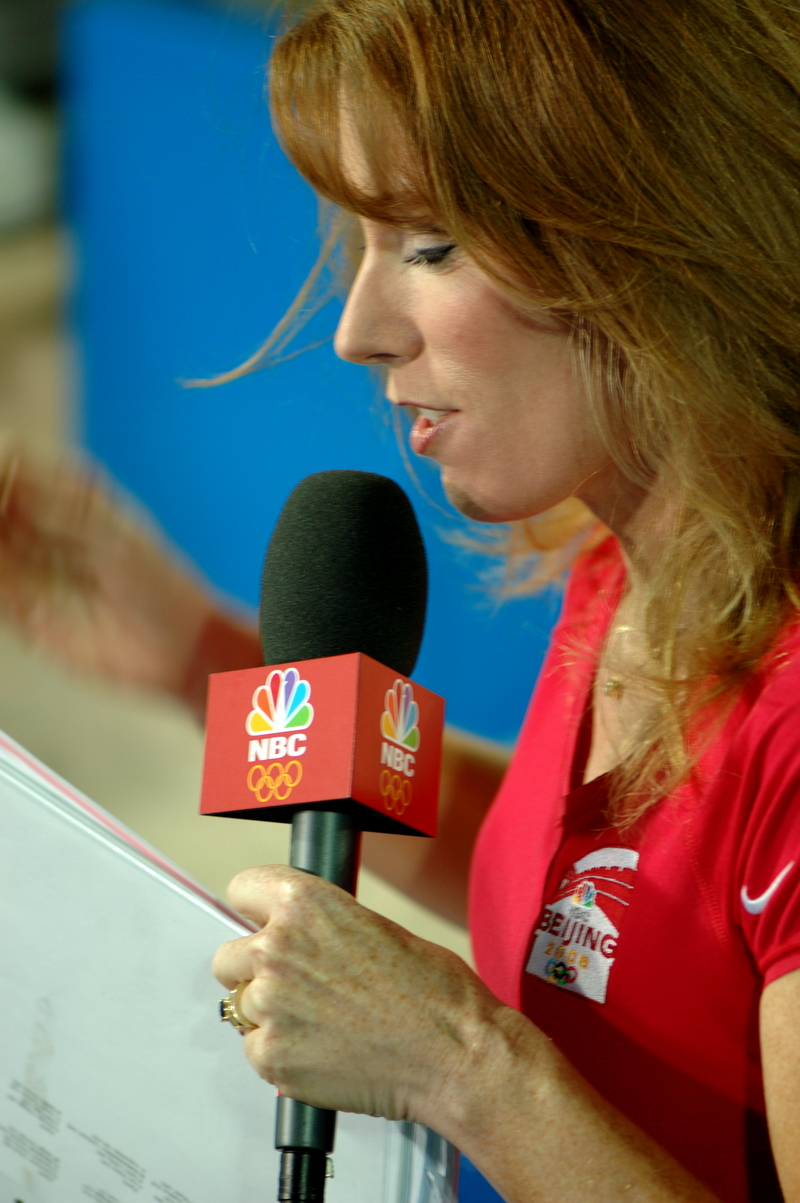
- Cox reporting at the 2008 Summer Olympics
- Born: Heather Schoeny; June 3, 1970 (age 56)
- Education: University of the Pacific
- Occupation: Sideline reporter
- Years active: 1987–present
- Employer: NBC Sports
- Spouse: Bill Cox
- Children: Will Cox, Ally Cox

Heather Cox (née Schoeny) (born June 3, 1970) is an American sportscaster who is a sports reporter for NBC. As Heather Schoeny, she played college volleyball at University of the Pacific.

== Biography ==
=== High school ===
Cox attended Capistrano Valley High School in Mission Viejo, CA, and was a star player on both the basketball and volleyball teams there. Repeated injuries led her to choose volleyball as her collegiate sport.

=== Volleyball career ===
Cox's collegiate athletic career included four years (1988 to 1991) on the University of the Pacific (Division I) women's volleyball team, serving as team captain on a team that was ranked in the top five nationally from 1988 to 1991, reached the Final Four and was a national championship runner-up in 1990. Cox graduated from the University of the Pacific with a degree in communications in 1992. She was a member of the United States National Volleyball Team from 1987 to 1995 and competed at the United States Olympic Festival in 1990. Cox played professional volleyball in the National Volleyball Association as team captain of the Sacramento Stars.

=== Broadcasting career ===
==== ESPN ====
From 1994 to 2016, Cox served as a reporter for ABC Sports and ESPN's coverage of the NBA on ESPN, NBA on ABC, college football on ABC, college football on ESPN, NCAA basketball on ESPN, NCAA basketball on ABC, the WNBA and professional volleyball. Beginning in 1994, she also served as the analyst for ESPN's coverage of the men's and women's NCAA Volleyball Championships and women's NCAA basketball. In 2012, Cox was named as Erin Andrews's replacement on ABC's Saturday Night College Football Game of the Week.

==== Other work ====
Cox began her broadcast career as a basketball analyst for Fox Sports Net in 1993 and covered college football, professional basketball and volleyball during her tenure at Fox Sports Net. Cox worked as a columnist for the Pac-10 Conference, writing a weekly national volleyball column in 2000. From 1999 to 2000, she served as a reporter on Running with the Pac magazine show.

Cox has also worked for CBS Sports, reporting on the men's NCAA basketball tournament, motocross and auto racing, and as an analyst on its women's college basketball coverage. She also served as an analyst and reporter for the 1998 and 2001 Goodwill Games for Turner Sports. In 2002, she reported on the NBA Playoffs. She served as analyst for Oxygen media network's coverage of the WNBA. She also served as a reporter for Olympic qualifying volleyball on the Oxygen media network.

Cox is the recipient of the 2004 USA Volleyball E. Douglas Boyden Media Recognition Award.

==== NBC and NFL Network ====
From 2003 until its end, Cox served as a reporter on NBC's AVP pro beach volleyball coverage. She made her NBC Olympic debut reporting from both the volleyball and beach volleyball competitions at the 2004 Athens Games. Cox returned to NBC Sports for Olympic assignments as beach volleyball reporter in 2008 and 2012. During the 2016 Summer Paralympics in Rio de Janeiro, Brazil, Cox served as a poolside reporter for American paralympic broadcaster NBCSN during the swimming competitions at the Paralympics.

Cox currently works as a sideline reporter for Golf Channel, and NBC's Olympic coverage. She previously worked the sidelines for Thursday Night Football broadcasts on NBC and NFL Network. She also worked alongside Michele Tafoya on NBC's two NFL playoff broadcasts for the 2016 season.
