= Rod Gilmore =

American football analyst (born 1960)

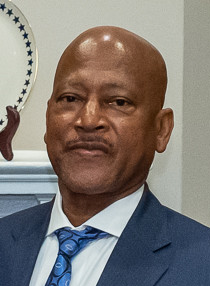
- Gilmore in 2023
- Born: Rodney Curt Gilmore; January 31, 1960 (age 66); Oakland, California, U.S.
- Education: Stanford University; University of California, Berkeley School of Law (J.D.)
- Occupation: College football analyst
- Years active: 1990–present
- Television: Pacific Sports Network (1990); SportsChannel Bay Area (1991–1993); Prime Sports Network (1993–1995); ABC and ESPN (1996–present)

Rodney Curt Gilmore (born January 31, 1960) is an American college football analyst, working for ABC and ESPN since 1996. He played college football as a defensive back for the Stanford Cardinal.

Prior to joining ABC and ESPN in 1996, Gilmore worked for Pacific Sports Network, SportsChannel Bay Area and Prime Sports Network. He is a 1982 graduate of Stanford University, where he played defensive back for three years. He received his J.D. degree from the University of California, Berkeley in 1986. He was part of the Stanford team that was involved in The Play, a last-second kickoff return by the University of California's Golden Bears to defeat Stanford on November 20, 1982.

In addition to calling college football games, Gilmore is a practicing attorney in the San Francisco Bay Area. His father, Carter Gilmore, was the first African American elected to the Oakland, California, city council; and his wife, Marie Gilmore, was elected as the mayor of Alameda, California, in November 2010.

On August 15, 2016, it was made public that Gilmore had been diagnosed with blood cancer.
