= David Norrie =

American football player (born 1963)

No. 17
- Position: Quarterback

Personal information
- Born: November 30, 1963 (age 62); Boston, Massachusetts, U.S.
- Listed height: 6 ft 4 in (1.93 m)
- Listed weight: 220 lb (100 kg)

Career information
- High school: Jesuit (Beaverton, Oregon)
- College: UCLA
- NFL draft: 1986: 11th round, 291st overall pick

Career history
- Seattle Seahawks (1986)*; New York Jets (1987)
- * Offseason or practice squad member only

Career NFL statistics
- Passing attempts: 68
- Passing completions: 35
- Completion percentage: 51.5%
- TD–INT: 1–4
- Passing yards: 376
- Passer rating: 48.4
- Stats at Pro Football Reference

David Doherty Norrie (born November 30, 1963) is an American former professional football player who was a quarterback for the New York Jets of the National Football League (NFL). He played college football for the UCLA Bruins. After his playing career, he became a longtime college football game analyst for ESPN and ABC.

== Biography ==
Norrie attended Jesuit High School in Beaverton, Oregon. He was a four-year letterman in football at the University of California, Los Angeles (UCLA) from 1982 to 1985. As a senior in 1985, he started at quarterback for the Bruins, leading his team to the Pacific-10 Conference championship and a berth in the 1986 Rose Bowl against Iowa. Norrie was injured in practice a week before the New Years Day game and was forced to sit out the game. During his senior season at UCLA, Norrie led the Pacific-10 Conference in passing.

Norrie was drafted by the Seattle Seahawks in the 11th round of the 1986 NFL draft. He played for the New York Jets in 1987. After spending the entire preseason on the Jets' roster, Norrie started two games at quarterback for the Jets during the 1987 NFL strike.

Norrie got his start as a college football analyst in 1991, working four years as the UCLA color analyst on radio broadcasts for the Bruins. In 1995, Norrie entered college football television broadcasting as a game analyst for Fox Sports Net. He worked four years with the network, announcing Pacific-10 Conference games, as well as occasional game assignments nationally.

For about a decade, Norrie worked as a television game analyst for ESPN and ABC, announcing games on fall Saturdays in all of the major college football conferences. His assignments for ESPN and ABC included rivalry games such as Texas–Oklahoma, Michigan–Ohio State, Florida–Florida State, Florida State–Miami, UCLA–USC, and Miami–Virginia Tech, and bowl games such as the Peach Bowl, Capital One Bowl, Sugar Bowl and Rose Bowl. Until the fall of 2018, Norrie was the analyst for the ESPN radio game of the week.
