= Ron Franklin =

American sportscaster (1942–2022)

- Born: Ronald Franklin; February 2, 1942; Jackson, Mississippi, U.S.
- Died: January 18, 2022 (aged 79); Austin, Texas, U.S.
- Education: University of Mississippi
- Notable credit: Jake Wade Memorial Award
- Title: Play-by-Play Commentator / Co-Host Outdoors Events

Ronald Franklin (February 2, 1942 – January 18, 2022) was an American sportscaster. He was employed by ESPN from 1987 to 2011. He was fired by ESPN on January 4, 2011, after allegedly making sexist comments to a colleague. Franklin brought a wrongful termination suit against his former employer, alleging breach of contract by ESPN. The parties settled out of court.

== Early life and career ==
Franklin grew up in Hazelhurst, Mississippi. His mother allowed him to play sports in school as long as he also agreed to take voice lessons. His family moved to Oxford, Mississippi when he was 14. He suffered a head injury in high school that resulted in the formation of a blood clot that ended his football career and made him ineligible for the military. Around the same time he found work as a teen disc jockey, which got him interested in combining his interests in broadcasting and sports.

While a student at the University of Mississippi, Franklin worked the wake-up shift at a radio station, attended classes during the day, and then returned to the station in the evening to work on commercials. For further vocal training, he performed in college theater. He was an alumnus member of Sigma Alpha Epsilon fraternity.

Prior to ESPN, he was basketball and football play-by-play commentator for the University of Texas from 1983 to 1988. He was the play-by-play voice of the Houston Oilers from 1971 to 1982. He also worked as sports director for four different local news stations: KSWS-TV (now KOBR) in Roswell, New Mexico in 1965, KVOO-TV (now KJRH-TV) in Tulsa, Oklahoma from 1967 to 1971, and in Houston, Texas with KHOU-TV from 1971 to 1980, then with KPRC-TV from 1980 to 1987.

== ESPN ==
While at ESPN, he primarily worked as a play-by-play commentator for ESPN's coverage of college basketball and college football. From 1987 to 2005, he anchored ESPN College Football Primetime primarily with Mike Gottfried. In 2006, he moved to ESPN2 College Football Primetime with Ed Cunningham. In 2007, that crew moved to ESPN on ABC to call mainly Big 12 games. His trademark call of a long run was "Has five! Has ten! Count it off at (final yardage)."

In college basketball, he was the primary ESPN play-by-play man with Fran Fraschilla for Big 12 games. The duo also called the NIT Championship. He also called the tennis French Open, college baseball and the U.S. Olympic Festival, He hosted in some years the Miss Texas USA Pageants.

He signed a contract extension with ESPN in 2006.

=== Holly Rowe incident ===
On October 1, 2005, during a game between Notre Dame and Purdue that Franklin was calling, sideline reporter Holly Rowe praised Purdue defensive coordinator Brock Spack for using all three timeouts on defense despite trailing by four touchdowns late in the game. "If the coaches are giving up," Rowe added, "What does that say to the players?" Franklin responded, "Holly, it's not giving up. It's 49–21, sweetheart."

In response to that, Mo Davenport, senior coordinating producer for college football said, "It was an inappropriate comment, and we've communicated that to Ron. There's never a reason to say something so mean-spirited. Ron apologized. We dealt with it internally."

=== Jeannine Edwards incident ===
After a production meeting prior to ESPN's telecast of the Chick-fil-A Bowl on December 31, 2010, Franklin addressed sideline reporter Jeannine Edwards in a condescending tone as "sweet baby"; when she objected, Franklin called her an "asshole". The incident was reported to ESPN by Ed Cunningham, and ESPN tried to pull Franklin from the Chick Fil-A coverage that night but was unable; instead, Franklin was removed from ESPN Radio's coverage of the 2011 Fiesta Bowl the following day.

Franklin apologized for his remarks the following Monday and said he deserved to be pulled from the Fiesta Bowl. However, ESPN fired Franklin the following day; in a statement, ESPN noted, "Based on what occurred last Friday, we have ended our relationship with him."

== Personal life and death ==
Franklin was married with one child. He lived in Austin, Texas, and died there on January 18, 2022, at the age of 79, from pneumonia.
