= Todd McShay =

American football television analyst and commentator (born 1977)

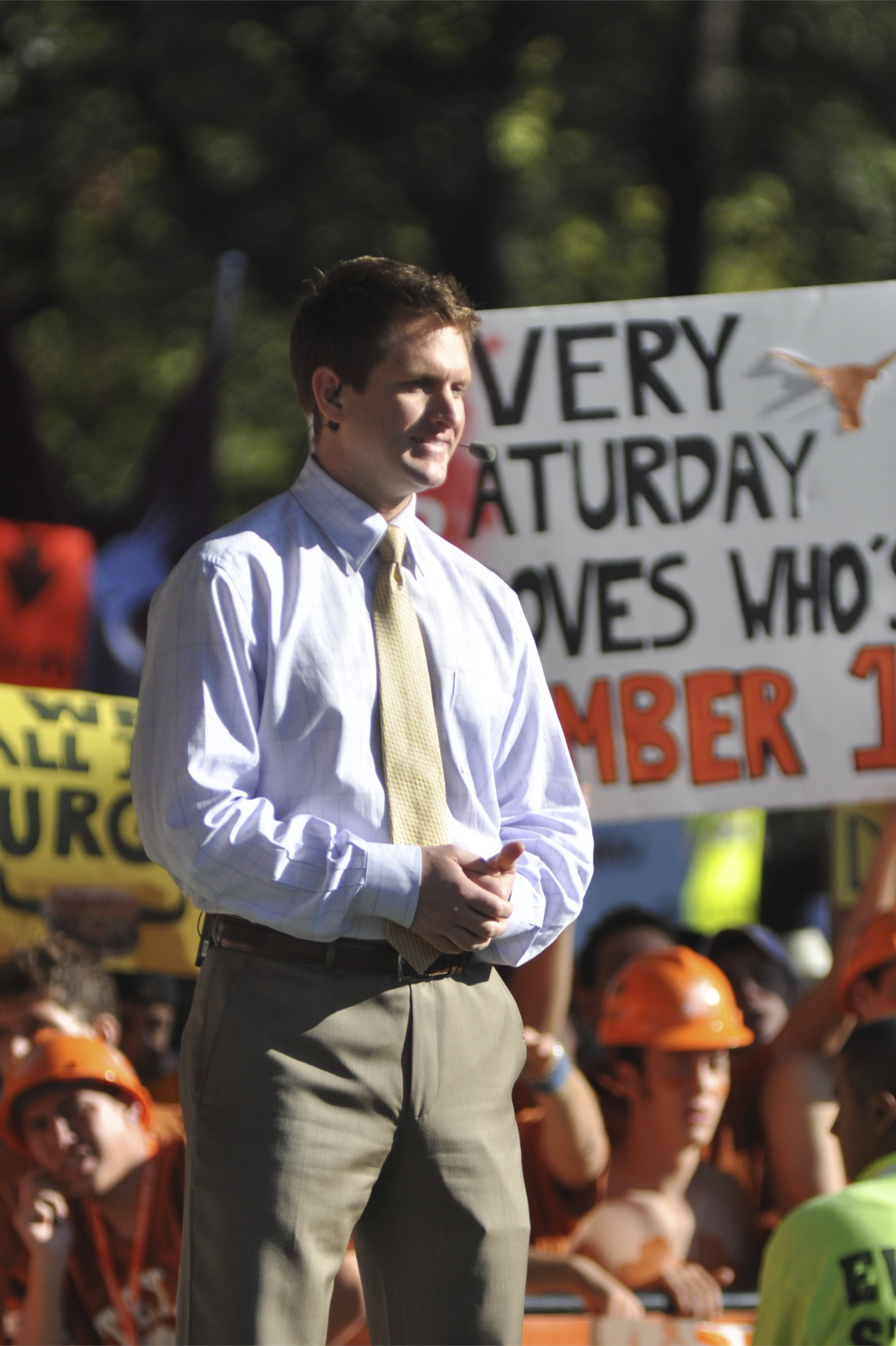
- McShay working for ESPN College GameDay in Austin, Texas

Personal information
- Full name: Todd Marshall McShay
- Born: March 22, 1977 (age 49) Salem, Massachusetts, U.S.
- Occupations: American football television analyst; commentator

Sport
- Former partner: ESPN

Todd Marshall McShay (born March 22, 1977) is an American football television analyst and commentator.

== Early life ==
McShay attended North Shore Christian School in Lynn, Massachusetts and then Swampscott High School in Swampscott, Massachusetts, where he played quarterback for the Big Blue, and graduated in 1995. In high school he was friends and classmates with Dave Portnoy, owner of Barstool Sports.

He then attended the University of Richmond, where he was a walk-on for the Spiders in 1995 and served as a scout-team quarterback.

He graduated from Richmond in 1999 with a B.A. from the Jepson School of Leadership Studies.

== Professional career ==
McShay had worked as an undergraduate team equipment manager at the University of Richmond before landing an internship with former NFL scout Gary Horton in 1998. Following graduation, McShay worked full-time for "The War Room", (1999–2006) a start-up publication created by Horton eventually bought by ESPN and renamed "Scouts Inc."

He joined ESPN in 2006 as a football analyst, providing in-depth scouting information on college football players across the country. He made regular appearances on a number of ESPN programs, including ESPNU Coaches Spotlight, SportsCenter, and ESPN Radio focusing on the NFL draft. He was often featured alongside ESPN college football analyst Mel Kiper, Jr.

On September 7, 2021, McShay announced he was taking a break from ESPN "to focus on my health and my family". This came three days after an unsteady performance while working as a sideline reporter on an ESPN college football broadcast, during which viewers expressed concern on social media about his well-being during an on-air segment. McShay returned to on-air work with ESPN on October 27, 2021. He was laid off on June 30, 2023.

In the fall of 2024, McShay joined the Ringer as a full-time host of his own eponymous podcast, the McShay Show. McShay had previously been a frequent guest on other podcasts at the Ringer, including the Ryen Russillo Podcast with Ryen Russillo.

== Personal life ==
McShay was married to Lauren "Lo" (Sullivan) McShay, a Boston University graduate and current owner of LoLo Event Design in Boston. He recently spoke about being newly engaged.

== Sources ==
- Todd McShay ESPN MediaZone (March 10, 2010)
- ESPN MediaZone (June 2, 2011)
