= Joe Schad =

American football journalist

Joe Schad (born c. 1974) is a reporter, writer, analyst and broadcaster focused on college football and the NFL for more than 20 years. In July 2016, Schad announced he would begin covering the Miami Dolphins and the NFL at the Palm Beach Post.

Schad joined ESPN in 2005 as a sports reporter, working as ESPN's National College Football Reporter and appearing on shows including College Football Live, SportsCenter, College GameDay, ESPN First Take, and ESPNEWS. Schad provided college football news and notes for SportsCenter. In addition, Schad wrote news stories and blogged for ESPN.com. Schad hosted a college football show for ESPN Radio and has done college football and NFL sideline reporting for ESPN, ABC and ESPN Radio. Between 2010 and 2015, Schad broadcast more than 145 games for ESPN Radio, including the Orange Bowl, Rose Bowl, Fiesta Bowl, Sugar Bowl, BCS National Championship Game and College Football Playoff Semifinals and National Championship Game.

Schad is known for his breaking news, including underclassmen declaring for the NFL draft as well as reporting numerous coaches who have been hired or fired, players who have transferred and coaching contract extensions. Schad reported feature stories and sitdown conversations for shows like College GameDay, SportsCenter and Outside The Lines. Some of Schad's more notable interview subjects are Urban Meyer, Pete Carroll, Mack Brown, Bobby Bowden, Joe Paterno, Tim Tebow, Steve Spurrier, Jake Locker, Sam Bradford, Bobby Petrino, Tyrann Mathieu and Kenneth Starr. Schad has reported on several NCAA investigations including ones into Reggie Bush, Cam Newton, Johnny Manziel, Marvin Austin, Rhett Bomar, Florida State, Tennessee, North Carolina, Michigan, Oregon and Baylor.

== Early life and career ==
Schad grew up in Glendale, New York and graduated in 1992 from St. Francis Preparatory School in Fresh Meadows, Queens and in 1997 from St. John's University in New York earning a degree in journalism. While a student at St. John's, Schad was the editor in chief and sports editor of St. John's student-managed newspaper, The Torch. He was also the sports director of WSJU, St. John's official radio station. Schad was recognized with several journalism awards during his collegiate career from the APSE and FSWA.

== Before ESPN ==
After graduating from St. John's, Schad covered college and professional sports for Newsday and also worked as a researcher for ESPN The Magazine.

In 1999, Schad left New York and began working as a beat writer and general assignment reporter for the Orlando Sentinel/Ft. Lauderdale Sun-Sentinel where he covered the University of Florida. During his tenure at the Sentinel, he broke numerous football and men's basketball stories including: a gambling scandal, street brawl, transfers, drug suspensions, accusations of rape, players turning pro and coaching hires.

In 2003, Schad began his first stint covering the Miami Dolphins for the Palm Beach Post where he garnered national attention for his work on the Ricky Williams' drug use, and an FBI investigation into hate mail sent to several prominent athletes.

Schad currently resides in Parkland, Florida.
