= Bill Rosinski =

American sportscaster and talk show host

Bill Rosinski is an American sportscaster and talk show host, operating primarily out of Charlotte, North Carolina. Rosinski currently works for ESPN Radio as its lead college football and college basketball commentator, as well as for ISP Sports calling ACC sports. Before taking the job at ESPN Radio in 2009 Rosinski had spent the last four seasons calling National Football League games for Westwood One radio. He also calls NFL games for ESPN Radio starting in 2013. He has also called the NFL on Westwood One.

== Career ==
Rosinski began his broadcasting career at UPI, where he was a reporter and sports director for UPI Radio. He first began working for Westwood One in 1985 after spending three years at UPI Radio, and stayed there until 1992. Rosinski's primary responsibilities were to cover football and college basketball games for the network.

Rosinski left Westwood One for a job as the Atlanta Falcons' radio play-by-play voice on WSB-AM, a position he held until the end of the 1994 season when he took the same position with the expansion Carolina Panthers. He was with the Panthers until the end of the 2004 season and called every major game for the franchise that occurred while he was there, including two NFC championship game appearances and Super Bowl XXXVIII. Rosinski wrote a book about his career with the Panthers, appropriately titled Bill Rosinki's Tales from the Carolina Panthers, which was released in 2007.

After a year layoff Rosinski returned to Westwood One to replace Dave Sims, who became the voice of Sunday Night Football, as one of the network's Sunday afternoon play-by-play men alongside Harry Kalas. Rosinski was paired with former NFL coach Dan Reeves for all three of his seasons at Westwood One and called playoff games for the last two of those seasons including the 2007 NFC Championship game. Rosinski returned to the college basketball ranks for Westwood One in 2009, calling early round regional games for the network in what proved to be his last assignment for Westwood One.

== Other ventures ==
Rosinski had his own radio show, "The Bill Rosinski Show", which aired on four stations in the Carolinas beginning in late 2005. It was cancelled in November 2007 by its syndicator, Charis Radio Network.

Rosinski hosts a weekly television program in the greater Charlotte broadcast area (on 4 Cable TV networks, DirecTV and Dish Network covering over 24 counties in NC and SC reaching as many as 2.2 million viewers) called "Sportsnight with Bill Rosinski" produced by Cullis Entertainment (www.cullisent.com / www.myspace.com/tvsportsshow / www.myspace.com/cullisentertainment)

Rosinski previously worked for Jefferson Pilot Sports as a broadcaster. He also occasionally broadcasts ACC football and basketball for ISP Sports.

In 2009 Rosinski was part of Westwood One's Men's NCAA basketball tournament coverage for the first time since re-joining the network in 2006; he called first and second round action for the network.

In the summer of 2009 Rosinski left Westwood One to become the play by play voice of college football and basketball for ESPN Radio. He continues to call ACC football and basketball for ISP Sports.

Rosinski is also an on-course commentator for SiriusXM's PGA Tour Network during the football offseason.

== See also ==
Rosinski's Westwood One Bio

Fan site for "Sportsnight at the Southend Brewery"
