= College Football on ABC =

Television series

- The SEC on ABC logo, used for the network’s primary college football package since 2024.
- Genre: American college football game telecasts
- Presented by: Various commentators
- Theme music composer: John Colby (main theme); Bob Christianson (SEC home games only)
- Opening theme: ESPN College Football theme (main theme); SEC on ABC theme (SEC home games only)
- Ending theme: Same as opening
- Country of origin: United States
- Original language: English
- No. of seasons: 77 (through 2026 season)

Production
- Production locations: Various NCAA stadiums (game telecasts); ESPN Headquarters; Bristol, Connecticut, U.S. (pre-game, halftime and post-game shows); ABC and ESPN Studio; 7 Hudson Square, Manhattan, New York City (alternate pre-game, halftime and post-game shows)
- Camera setup: Multi-camera
- Running time: 210 minutes or until game ends (inc. adverts)
- Production companies: National Collegiate Athletic Association; ABC Sports (1950, 1952, 1954–1956 and 1960–2006); ESPN (2006–present)

Original release
- Network: ABC
- Release: September 30, 1950 – present

Related
- College Football Countdown; College GameDay; Saturday Night Football

College Football on ABC refers to broadcasts of NCAA college football games produced by ABC Sports and ESPN for ABC and ESPN DTC. Programs have been referred to as "ABC College Football" or "ABC Sports College Football" or simply "College Football".

ABC first began broadcasting regular season college football games in 1950, and has aired games of the now-National Collegiate Athletic Association (NCAA) Division I Football Bowl Subdivision (FBS) annually since 1966. After the ABC Sports division was merged into ESPN Inc. by parent company Disney in 2006, broadcasts have since been produced by ESPN and have been billed as part of ESPN College Football.

Since the 2024 season, ABC has primarily broadcast Southeastern Conference (SEC) games, billed as the SEC on ABC, succeeding the conference's long-time relationship with CBS. ABC also carries games from other conferences such as the American, Atlantic Coast, and Big 12, billed as ABC College Football. ABC typically broadcasts three Saturday games per-week, including afternoon games at 12:00 p.m (currently billed as ABC College Football/SEC on ABC presented by Starbucks for sponsorship reasons) and 3:30 p.m. ET (currently billed as SEC on ABC presented by Burger King), and Saturday Night Football in prime time. ABC also carries selected conference championships, bowl games, and College Football Playoff games.

== History ==
=== 1950s ===
By 1950, a small number of prominent football colleges, including the University of Pennsylvania (ABC) and the University of Notre Dame (DuMont Television Network) had entered into individual contracts with networks to broadcast their games on a regional basis. In fact, all of Penn's home games were broadcast on ABC during the 1950 season under a contract that paid the university $150,000. However, prior to the 1951 season, the NCAA – alarmed by reports that indicated television broadcasts had decreased attendance at games – asserted control and prohibited live game broadcasts. Although the NCAA successfully forced Penn and Notre Dame to break their contracts, the NCAA suffered withering attacks for its 1951 policy, faced threats of antitrust hearings and eventually caved in and lifted blackouts of certain sold-out games. Bowl games were always outside the control of the NCAA, and the 1952 Rose Bowl at the end of that season was the first truly national telecast of a college football game, on NBC.

For the 1952 season, the NCAA relented somewhat, but limited telecasts to one nationally broadcast game each week. The NCAA sold the exclusive rights to broadcast the weekly game to NBC for $1.144 million. ABC was able to circumvent these restrictions by producing a television series, Notre Dame Football, that featured a filmed version of the previous day's Notre Dame Fighting Irish football contest, with dead ball time and some inconsequential plays edited out for time, on Sunday evenings in fall 1953. Because the telecast was not live, it was legal under NCAA rules. ABC acquired the exclusive NCAA contract for 1954, losing it in 1955 to NBC.

The NCAA believed that broadcasting a single live game per week would prevent further controversy while limiting any decrease in attendance. However, the Big Ten Conference was unhappy with the arrangement, and it pressured the NCAA to allow regional telecasts as well. Finally in 1955, the NCAA revised its plan, keeping eight national games while permitting regional telecasts on five specified weeks during the season. ABC won the contract under this arrangement for 1960 and 1961.

=== 1960s ===
ABC won the NCAA contract from the 1966 season onwards. This was essentially the television plan that stayed in place until the University of Oklahoma and the University of Georgia filed a lawsuit against the NCAA in 1981, alleging antitrust violations. The lawsuit, NCAA v. Board of Regents of the University of Oklahoma, made it all the way to the Supreme Court, who in 1984 ruled in favor of Oklahoma and Georgia and declared the NCAA's forced collective contract a violation of antitrust law. ABC then negotiated with the College Football Association for its game package.

ABC announced the entire 1966 TV schedule in June with 8 national games and 24 regional games for a total of 15 broadcast windows. In 1966, the NCAA allowed each school to appear on ABC for at most one national telecast and one regional telecast. On November 19, 1966, ABC showed a regional doubleheader. The main early game was Notre Dame-Michigan State (ranked 1 and 2). This was the famous 10–10 tie. ABC was unable to televise this game live nationally due to the above restriction. However, ABC got approval from the NCAA to show this game on tape delay in the late timeslot in the regions of the country which got Kentucky-Tennessee in the early timeslot.

On September 23, 1967, Chris Schenkel and Bud Wilkinson were scheduled to announce the Penn State-Navy game. However, there was an NABET strike of engineers and technicians which AFTRA was supporting and this duo (members of AFTRA) refused to work the game. So ABC Sports producer Chuck Howard did play-by-play on this game. Howard lined up Jim Tarman (Penn State's SID) and Bud Thalman (Navy's SID) to provide color commentary.

On October 12 and October 19, 1968, Keith Jackson worked with Bud Wilkinson on the primary game because Chris Schenkel was in Mexico City working the Olympics. The November 16 Alabama-Miami game was the first ever prime time regular season college football national telecast.

=== 1970s ===
The September 2, 1973 edition of the Abeliene (TX) Reporter-News stated that ABC would be broadcasting 37 games (24 regionally, 13 nationally) that season. Chris Schenkel, Keith Jackson, Bill Flemming, Lynn Sanner, and Bob Murphy were named as the play-by-play men with Bud Wilkinson, Duffy Daugherty (who joined Schenkel and Wilkinson, creating a 3-man booth for its #1 team), Lee Grosscup, Forest Evashevski, and Monty Stickles as color commentators. College Football Today both preceded and followed the games. At halftime, was first half highlights and Coaches Corner with a different coach being interviewed weekly.

In 1974, ABC elevated Jackson to #1 announcer replacing Chris Schenkel, who moved to anchor the studio show. Also that year, ABC used many active coaches (who were on off-weeks) as guest analysts. John McKay was originally scheduled to work the season opener (UCLA @ Tennessee) on September 7, but Bob Devaney (then-Athletic Director for the Nebraska Cornhuskers) called the game with Jackson. Meanwhile, ABC added Jim Lampley and Don Tollefson for sideline interviews and features on the telecasts. This duo made its debut on the September 7 game. The September 9, 1974 game (Notre Dame @ Georgia Tech) was the first ever NCAA college football Monday night telecast. For the Monday night telecast, Jackson paired with the then-Texas head coach Darrell Royal to broadcast the game.

In 1975, ABC carried two Monday night games. The first Monday night game was Missouri vs. Alabama on September 8, and Notre Dame vs. Boston College (at Foxboro) on September 15. ABC continued to use active coaches as guest commentators on some games this year.

In 1976, ABC added ex-Notre Dame coach Ara Parseghian as its #1 analyst. ABC opened the season with a Thursday night telecast (UCLA @ Arizona State).

By 1977, Keith Jackson, Chris Schenkel, Verne Lundquist, Jim Lampley, and Bill Flemming were ABC's primary play-by-play announcers. Schenkel called the October 15 game (Texas @ Arkansas) as Jackson was calling Game 4 of the World Series later that afternoon. Ex-Arkansas coach and Frank Broyles was in his first year with ABC as an analyst. Meanwhile, Ara Parseghian and Lee Grosscup were ABC's primary analysts along with Broyles. In other words, Grosscup essentially alternated with Broyles and Parseghian as the #1 analyst. ABC had a policy which prevented Broyles from calling any Arkansas games since he was still employed by Arkansas (as the athletic director).

ABC opened the 1978 season with a prime time game on the Saturday of Labor Day weekend (Nebraska vs. Alabama at Birmingham) and also carried a prime time game (Texas A&M @ Texas) on Friday, December 1. On October 7, after calling the Oklahoma-Texas game in Dallas, Keith Jackson headed to New York and called Game 4 of the American League Championship Series that night. On December 2, ABC showed both Division II semifinals and the Division III Championship regionally with Georgia Tech @ Georgia. And on December 9, ABC showed the Division 1AA semifinals regionally with the Division II final.

ABC did not carry any prime time games in 1979. On October 13, ABC joined the football game (Oklahoma vs. Texas at Dallas) in progress after Game 4 of the World Series. Meanwhile, ESPN (which launched in September 1979) televised selected non-ABC games on tape delay. ABC had exclusive rights to live telecasts.

=== 1980s ===
ABC opened the 1980 season with a prime time game (Arkansas @ Texas) on Labor Day. On October 11, after calling the Oklahoma-Texas game in Dallas, Keith Jackson headed to Houston and joined the telecast of Game 4 of the National League Championship Series in the middle innings.

By 1981, ABC used Frank Broyles as the #1 analyst after a few years of essentially alternating with Ara Parseghian in that year. The next year, Ara worked for CBS. 1 of the games he didn't participate with Keith Jackson in the broadcast booth is the then-#1 Texas Longhorns being defeated by his Arkansas Razorbacks 42-11, which at the time he was still the athletic director for Arkansas, which goes against ABC Sports's policy. Also on that year, Chris Schenkel was removed from the College Football broadcasts altogether.

Per the September 1, 1982 edition of the Elyria (OH) Chronicle Telegram and the September 1, 1982 edition of Sports Illustrated, ABC and CBS officials met with NCAA representatives and flipped a coin to determine "control dates". This allowed the network with priority on a particular date to have first choice when selecting the game it wished to air and whether it wanted the 12:00 ET or 3:30 ET timeslot. CBS won the first toss and thus earned first choice on seven dates: September 18, September 25, October 2, October 9, October 16, November 6, and November 20. ABC then got first pick on six dates, September 11, October 23, October 30, November 13, November 27, and December 4. ABC and CBS also had the right to take away a game from WTBS as long as it did so no later than the Monday before the game. WTBS was only able to show teams that had not been on national TV in 1981 and a maximum of four teams that had been on regional TV on two occasions. Beginning in 1982, Jim Lampley hosted College Football Today alongside and Beano Cook. Jack Whitaker was also on the ABC pregame/halftime show.

On October 9, 1982, Game 4 of the ALCS ran so long after a lengthy rain delay that ABC was unable to join the football games (which included California @ Washington (although the network did join that game during the second rain delay), Holy Cross @ Colgate, Southern Miss vs. Mississippi State, and Iowa @ Indiana) until late in the 4th quarter. ABC did not air any college football game on October 16. CBS meanwhile, had the late window and NBC carried Game 4 of the World Series at 1 p.m. Lee Grosscup worked with Keith Jackson on two late season Arkansas games (on November 20 and December 4) because of ABC's aforementioned policy that prevented Broyles (who was the Arkansas AD) from calling Razorback games. Instead, he was assigned as an analyst for the USC-UCLA (November 20) contest and worked alongside Al Michaels. He would work again with Michaels the next year for the Gator Bowl contest between Iowa and Florida, while substituting for Grosscup, who was out with an illness.

On October 8, 1983, ABC aired some Division III games (including Muhlenberg @ Swarthmore, Carnegie Mellon @ Allegheny, and Heidelberg @ Mount Union) to small portions of the country to satisfy its TV contract requirements on DIII games. On October 15, ABC aired Game 4 of the World Series at 1 prior to Nebraska-Missouri while CBS went head-to-head with the World Series (with Texas @ Arkansas and South Dakota State @ Nebraska-Omaha) in most of the country.

As previously mentioned, in June 1984, a US Supreme Court ruling ended the control that the NCAA had exercised on televised college football and allowed individual colleges to make their own TV deals. CBS obtained rights to ACC, Big 10 and Pac 10 home games while ABC obtained rights to the College Football Association (essentially home games for all schools other than the B10 and P10). CBS also separately obtained rights to Miami Hurricanes home games, including the Boston College-Miami contest and the Army–Navy Game. CBS and ABC typically carried only 1-2 games per time slot rather than the frequent large slates of regional games in prior years. Meanwhile, ESPN carried live CFA games each Saturday typically at noon and 7:30 p.m. WTBS carried SEC games. USA Network also carried games (primarily the Big 8). ABC did not carry any games on September 22 while CBS did not carry any on October 6.

ABC used Al Trautwig on play-by-play on October 19, 1985 (Texas @ Arkansas) and Tim Brant on October 26 (Colorado @ Nebraska) as Al Michaels was calling the World Series. On December 7, Keith Jackson and Frank Broyles called the first half of SMU @ Oklahoma. Jackson became sick at halftime, so Brant and Broyles called the second half.

On October 11, 1986, Keith Jackson called Game 3 of the NLCS. Instead, Corey McPherrin (Miami @ West Virginia) and Tim Brant (Oklahoma vs. Texas) did play-by-play alongside Lynn Swann and Mike Adamle respectively for ABC that day.

In 1987, ABC took over Big 10/Pac 10 rights while CBS got rights to the CFA, while retaining the rights to broadcast ACC and Miami Hurricanes home games. On August 30, ABC carried the Kickoff Classic (Tennessee vs. Iowa) on a Sunday afternoon. Neither ABC nor CBS carried college football during the late afternoon on October 24 as ABC televised Game 6 of the World Series at 4 p.m. ET. The game ABC aired before the World Series was a 38–14 victory for the Iowa Hawkeyes over the Purdue Boilermakers.

In 1988, ABC used Chris Schenkel on two games in October (Washington @ Arizona State on the 8th and UCLA @ Arizona on the 22nd) alongside Dick Vermeil. On October 8, Gary Bender was on ALCS TV duty and thus Schnekel filled in for him.

=== 1990s ===
In 1991, ABC acquired the rights to the CFA from CBS in addition to the B10/P10 and went back to televising several regional games in many timeslots. Meanwhile, Notre Dame broke apart from the CFA and signed a deal with NBC for its home games. ABC televised six games on September 21 and used its Monday Night Football announcers (Al Michaels, Frank Gifford, and Dan Dierdorf) on two of those games. Michaels called the Arizona State-USC contest with Lynn Swann while Gifford and Dierdorf together, called Houston @ Illinois. One year later, Michaels would team with Swann again for a game between California and USC on October 17.

1992 was the first year that ABC made most of its regional games available via pay-per-view (similar to what became known as ESPN GamePlan). Meanwhile, ABC used Dan Dierdorf on play-by-play (with Bo Schembechler on color commentary) for a few games such as Bowling Green @ Ohio State on September 12 and Ohio State @ Indiana on November 14. The 1992 season also featured the inaugural SEC Championship Game.

On September 11, 1993, ABC televised a tripleheader. Notre Dame @ Michigan and Washington @ Ohio State in prime time were aired nationally while USC @ Penn State, Kansas @ Michigan State, Texas A&M @ Oklahoma, and LSU @ Mississippi State were all aired regionally at 3:30 p.m. Brent Musburger had a golf assignment on October 30 and thus, Roger Twibell called Notre Dame vs. Navy alongside Dick Vermeil in his place.

On its September 24, 1994 regional state, ABC included an 1-AA game featuring Alcorn State and Steve McNair.

ABC intentionally kept Bob Griese off of Michigan games during the 1995 season (per an ABC Sports policy) because his son Brian was the backup quarterback for the Wolverines. Meanwhile, Brent Musburger was on American League Division Series duty on October 7 and thus, Roger Twibell called Notre Dame @ Washington in his place. Mark Jones meanwhile, substituted for John Saunders as the studio host when Saunders was assigned to anchor ABC's coverage of the Major League Baseball playoffs. On November 11, Bob Griese attended parents weekend at Michigan, so Tim Brant worked the Nebraska @ Kansas broadcast with Keith Jackson. ABC expanded to a tripleheader (Army vs. Navy and Texas @ Texas A&M as the first two games) on December 2 and televised the SEC title game in prime time.

In 1996, CBS obtained rights to the SEC, Big East, and Army/Navy Game and also added a Conference USA game. ABC however, still had rights to the SEC title game. Meanwhile, ABC changed its policy from the previous season and allowed Bob Griese to call Michigan games. On September 21, ABC had planned to show Oklahoma @ San Diego State as one of its 3:30 regional games. But Major League Baseball moved the Padres game on that date from night to afternoon for the Fox game of the week creating a stadium conflict at Jack Murphy. MLB had priority so the San Diego State game was forced to the evening and off of ABC.

In 1997, ABC began using a fixed on-screen scoreboard on its broadcasts.

In 1998, ABC was awarded the first exclusive Bowl Championship Series television contract beginning with the 1999 series. In 2005, the network lost rights to most of the BCS games, including the BCS National Championship Game, to Fox beginning with the 2006-07 series, in a deal worth close to $20 million per game. Although due to a separate arrangement with the Pasadena Tournament of Roses Association, ABC retained the broadcast rights to events in the series that were held at the Rose Bowl stadium, such as the Rose Bowl Game and the 2010 BCS Championship. ABC sister network ESPN assumed the BCS rights, including the rights to the Rose Bowl, beginning in 2010.

Keith Jackson, who was supposed to retire after the 1998 season, stayed with the network until 2005, in which he announced games televised primarily from the West Coast, where he was based; Jackson's last broadcast with the network was the 2006 Rose Bowl.

In 1999, as Jackson reduced his schedule, ABC began the year with the team of Jackson and Bob Griese intact – albeit not as the lead announcing team, as they almost exclusively handled action from Pac-10 Conference teams; Brent Musburger and Dan Fouts returned, as did the longtime tandem of Brad Nessler and Gary Danielson (who reunited in 2017 on CBS). These assignments were not permanent and many different combinations were used ABC locked its broadcasting teams in mid-season. Jackson was teamed with Fouts, Musburger was paired with Danielson, and Nessler with Bob Griese.

=== 2000s ===
In 2000, ABC shifted Dan Fouts to the Monday Night Football booth. Besides teaming with Brent Musburger and Keith Jackson, Fouts the year prior, teamed with Charlie Jones at least once (UCLA @ USC on November 20).

Prior to the addition of the 12th game on a permanent basis in 2002, ABC aired pre-season classic games including the Kickoff Classic and Pigskin Classic. In the 2005 season, ABC aired 77 games in 36 windows including the National Championship.

From 2002 to 2005, ABC highlighted the top game of the week as the "BCS Spotlight Game."

On December 6, 2003, Tim Brant filled in for Keith Jackson, who was ill, on Oregon State @ USC.

The September 10, 2004 game between Florida State and Miami was originally scheduled for Labor Day (September 6) at 8 p.m. ET on ABC, but was moved due to a hurricane. The November 13 Utah-Wyoming game was delayed almost two hours due to a power failure. Also, due to poor lighting, ABC was only able to televise the 2nd half of the game.

Beginning with the 2006 season, ABC started regularly showing prime time games under the Saturday Night Football umbrella, while games with 12:00 p.m. Eastern game times are televised by ABC on an occasional basis. This marked a departure from 7:00 p.m. West Coast-only games (ending after the 2006 season) and occasional 8:00 p.m. games (occurring every week as part of Saturday Night Football). Also, the recently developed BCS Spotlight Game was essentially replaced by Saturday Night Football.

The 2006 season was marked by a lot of reshuffling in its broadcasting teams in addition to Jackson, as Lynn Swann departed from ABC to embark on a failed political run, Aaron Taylor left to pursue a career change, and Gary Danielson went to CBS to cover Southeastern Conference games. As a result, Dan Fouts began calling play-by-play.

ESPN, which is majority owned by The Walt Disney Company, has also increased its involvement with ABC over the years. Hosts from the cable channel's College GameDay program typically appear during halftime of the 3:30 game (often to preview the Saturday Night Football game they may have done the broadcast from) and when they are on-site during the Saturday night game. In addition, the announcers have become increasingly interchangeable. From the 2006 season onward, as part of a network-wide rebranding of sports coverage, broadcasts on ABC are now presented under ESPN branding and graphics as ESPN College Football on ABC.

On November 18, 2006, ABC's broadcast of the rivalry between Ohio State and Michigan (then the #1 and #2 teams in the AP Top 25 college football rankings), in which the Buckeyes defeated the Wolverines, 42–39, was the network's highest-rated college football contest in over 13 years.

=== 2010s ===
Since 2012, regional coverage has significantly decreased with the loss of certain Big Ten, Big 12 and Pac-12 rights to Fox College Football. ABC now airs a single game in the noon, 3:30 and 7:30 windows.

In 2013, ABC's Saturday Night Football theme music was implemented on all of the college football broadcasts across the ESPN networks, including ABC, ESPN, ESPN2, ESPNEWS, and ESPNU.

In 2015, a weekly noon window returned (with the exception of week one) for the first time since 2005.

=== 2020s ===
On November 21, 2020, ABC aired its first SEC regular season game since 1995, Florida–Vanderbilt, which was moved from ESPN due to the postponement of an ACC game (Clemson–Florida State) that was originally expected to air on the network due to COVID-19 pandemic complications.

On December 10, 2020, ESPN announced that it had acquired the top-tier rights to the SEC under a 10-year, $3 billion contract beginning in the 2024 season; ABC holds rights to the top SEC football package, replacing CBS. All SEC games broadcast by ABC are branded as the SEC on ABC, with the games introducing a distinct on-air presentation (including new graphics and a rearrangement of the 1990s ESPN College Football theme music) separate from other ESPN College Football telecasts, and later iterated upon by ESPN's subsequent College Football Playoff coverage, and all other games and studio shows in 2025.

Unlike CBS, which generally aired a single "game of the week" in a 3:30 p.m. window, SEC games may air in any of ABC's windows—including Saturday Night Football. Generally, ABC airs at least two SEC games per-week, but some weeks have featured SEC games in all three of ABC's windows (with these scenarios billed as SEC All Day presented by IHG Hotels & Resorts for sponsorship purposes).

Under a renewal of ESPN's contract for the College Football Playoff coinciding with its expansion to 12 teams, ABC began simulcasting two of the new first-round games beginning in 2024. ABC's simulcast of the inaugural first-round game on December 20, 2024, between the Indiana Hoosiers and the Notre Dame Fighting Irish, marked the first Fighting Irish home game since 1990 not to air on NBC Sports. Beginning in 2026–27, ABC will simulcast one game per-round with ESPN, adding one of the New Year's Day quarter-final games, a semi-final, and the College Football Playoff National Championship.

== Bowl games ==
The following bowl games have been broadcast on ABC:

- Music City Bowl (2022–2023)
- LA Bowl (2021–2023, 2025)
- Celebration Bowl (2015–present)
- Citrus Bowl (1987–2010, 2013–present)
- New Mexico Bowl (2022)
- Independence Bowl (1991, 2014, 2021)
- Outback Bowl (2011–2012, 2017, 2021)
- Las Vegas Bowl (2001, 2013–2019, 2023)
- Pop-Tarts Bowl (2019, 2024–2025)
- Boca Raton Bowl (2019)
- Duke's Mayo Bowl (2018, 2026–present)
- Liberty Bowl (1964–1980, 1995, 2011, 2017, 2027)
- Pinstripe Bowl (2015, 2024–present)
- Rose Bowl Game (1989–2010)
- BCS National Championship Game (2010)
- Fiesta Bowl (1999–2006)
- Orange Bowl (1962–1964, 1999–2006)
- Sugar Bowl (1953–1957, 1970–2006)
- Aloha Bowl (1986–2000)
- Peach Bowl (1989–1990)
- Gator Bowl (1965–1968, 1972–1985, 2025)
- Bluebonnet Bowl (1964–1967, 1973–1975)
- Gotham Bowl (1962)
- Bluegrass Bowl (1958)
- Cure Bowl (2023)
- Birmingham Bowl (2023)
- Armed Forces Bowl (2023)
- First Responder Bowl (2020, 2027)
- Alamo Bowl (2024)
- College Football Playoff First Round games (2024–present; simulcast with ESPN)
- CFP National Championship Game (beginning in 2027)
- Cactus Bowl (2026–present)

== Nielsen ratings ==
=== Top-rated recent regular season games ===
Rank	Date	Matchup				Viewers (millions)	TV Rating	Significance
1	November 26, 2016, 12:00 ET	#3 Michigan	27	#2 Ohio State	30	16.8	9.4	The Game/College GameDay
2	September 2, 2017, 8:00 ET	#3 Florida State	7	#1 Alabama	24	12.3	6.9	Chick-fil-A Kickoff Game/College GameDay
3	September 28, 2024, 7:30 ET	#2 Georgia	34	#4 Alabama	41	12.0	6.0	Rivalry/Saturday Night Football/College GameDay
4	November 21, 2015, 3:30 ET	#9 Michigan State	17	#3 Ohio State	14	11.0	6.6	College GameDay
5	September 4, 2016, 7:30 ET	#10 Notre Dame	47	Texas	50	10.9	6.4	
6	November 28, 2015, 12:00 ET	#8 Ohio State	42	#10 Michigan	13	10.8	6.4	The Game
7	September 3, 2022, 7:30 ET	#5 Notre Dame	10	#2 Ohio State	21	10.5	5.2	Saturday Night Football/College GameDay
8	October 1, 2016, 8:00 ET	#3 Louisville	36	#5 Clemson	42	9.3	5.5	Saturday Night Football/College GameDay
9	September 3, 2023, 7:30 ET	#5 LSU	24	#8 Florida State	45	9.2	4.7	Camping World Kickoff
10	September 29, 2018, 7:30 ET	#4 Ohio State	27	#9 Penn State	26	9.1	5.3	Rivalry/College GameDay

=== Recent Bowl Games ===
Year	Bowl	Matchup				Viewers (millions)	TV Rating
2022–23	Citrus Bowl	#17 LSU	63	Purdue	7	3.3	1.9
2022–23	Music City Bowl	Iowa	21	Kentucky	0	3.0	1.7
2022–23	Celebration Bowl (FCS)	NC Central	41	#10 Jackson State	34	2.4	1.4
2022–23	LA Bowl	Fresno State	29	Washington State	6	2.4	1.3
2022–23	New Mexico Bowl	BYU	24	SMU	23	2.0	1.2
2021–22	Citrus Bowl	#17 Iowa	17	#25 Kentucky	20	6.4	3.5
2021–22	Independence Bowl	UAB	31	#13 BYU	28	3.2	1.8
2021–22	LA Bowl	Utah State	24	Oregon State	13	2.8	1.7
2021–22	Celebration Bowl (FCS)	South Carolina State	31	#15 Jackson State	10	2.5	1.6
2020–21	Citrus Bowl	Auburn	19	#14 Northwestern	35	4.8	2.8
2020–21	Outback Bowl	Ole Miss	26	#11 Indiana	20	4.1	2.5
2020–21	First Responder Bowl	Louisiana	31	UTSA	24	2.0	1.2
2019–20	Citrus Bowl	#13 Alabama	35	#14 Michigan	16	14.0	8.0
2019–20	Camping World Bowl	#15 Notre Dame	33	Iowa State	9	4.2	2.7
2019–20	Las Vegas Bowl	#19 Boise State	7	Washington	38	2.6	1.6
2019–20	Boca Raton Bowl	SMU	28	Florida Atlantic	52	2.0	1.3
2019–20	Celebration Bowl (FCS)	Alcorn State	44	#23 North Carolina A&T	64	2.8	1.2
2018–19	Citrus Bowl	#14 Kentucky	27	#12 Penn State	24	7.7	4.4
2018–19	Las Vegas Bowl	Arizona State	20	#21 Fresno State	31	3.3	2.3
2018–19	Belk Bowl	South Carolina	0	Virginia	28	2.6	1.7
2018–19	Celebration Bowl (FCS)	#11 North Carolina A&T	24	Alcorn State	22	2.3	1.6

== Features ==
From 1981 until 2014, ABC aired the in-studio pre-game show College Football Countdown before its slate of regional games at 3:30 p.m. Eastern Time. For many years, College Football Countdown was broadcast from ABC's Time Square Studios. This ended in 2011 when a new set was built at the ESPN studios in Bristol, CT.

ABC aired the Sugar Bowl from 1969 to 2006, the Rose Bowl Game from 1989 to 2010, the Citrus Bowl from 1987 to 2010 and since 2013, and the Celebration Bowl throughout its existence.

From 1998 to 2005, when ABC held the exclusive rights to the Bowl Championship Series, the network aired a Bowl Championship Series Selection Show at the end of Championship Weekend on the Sunday after the games.

== ESPN on ABC personalities ==
Note: Only includes ESPN announcers who have called at least two ABC games during one season.

=== Current ===
==== 2026 pairings ====
1. Chris Fowler/Kirk Herbstreit/Holly Rowe/Laura Rutledge
2. Sean McDonough/Greg McElroy/Katie George
3. Joe Tessitore or Tom Hart/Jesse Palmer/Kris Budden
4. Bob Wischusen/Louis Riddick/Stormy Buonantony
5. Dave Pasch or Wes Durham/Dusty Dvoracek/Taylor McGregor
6. Tom Hart or Justin Kutcher/Roddy Jones/Quint Kessenich

==== Play-by-play ====
- Chris Fowler (2014–present)
- Tom Hart (2026–present)
- Sean McDonough (2008–2015, 2018–present)
- Dave Pasch (2009–present)
- Joe Tessitore (2008, 2011–2012, 2016–2017, 2020–present)
- Bob Wischusen (2007–present)

==== Game analysts ====
- Kirk Herbstreit (2006–present)
- Greg McElroy (2016–present)
- Jesse Palmer (2007, 2012–2016, 2023–present)
- Louis Riddick (2022–present)
- Roddy Jones (2024–present)
- Dusty Dvoracek (2017–present)
- Brock Osweiler (2022–present)

==== Sideline reporters ====
- Holly Rowe (2006–present)
- Laura Rutledge (2018–present)
- Katie George (2020–present)
- Stormy Buonantony (2020–present)
- Kris Budden (2016–present)
- Quint Kessenich (2007–present)
- Taylor McGregor (2021–present)

==== Rules analysts ====
- Matt Austin (2026–present)
- Steve Shaw (2026–present)

==== Studio hosts ====
- Kevin Negandhi (2017–present)

==== Studio analysts ====
- Booger McFarland (2017, 2020–present)
- Jordan Rodgers (2026–present)

=== Former ===
==== Play-by-play ====
- Adam Amin (2015–2019)
- Allen Bestwick (2016)
- Carter Blackburn (2010–2011)
- Jason Benetti (2017–2021)
- Eric Collins (2006, 2008)
- Dave Flemming (2013-2025)
- Dan Fouts (2006–2007)
- Ron Franklin (2007–2010)
- Terry Gannon (2007–2009)
- Mark Jones (2006–2025)
- Dave LaMont (2006–2018)
- Steve Levy (2016–2019)
- Brent Musburger (2006–2016)
- Mark Neely (2010–2018)
- Brad Nessler (2006–2015)
- Mike Patrick (2006–2017)
- Gary Thorne (2006–2007)

==== Game analysts ====
- Anthony Becht (2016–2018)
- Mike Bellotti (2010, 2015–2016)
- Ray Bentley (2006–2018)
- Rocky Boiman (2015–2018)
- Tim Brant (2006–2007)
- Ed Cunningham (2007–2016)
- Bill Curry (2007)
- Bob Davie (2006, 2008, 2011)
- David Diaz-Infante (2009, 2013)
- Mike Golic (2020)
- Mike Golic Jr. (2020–2021)
- Bob Griese (2006–2010)
- Brian Griese (2009–2010, 2013–2019)
- Robert Griffin III (2021–2023)
- Danny Kanell (2011–2012, 2015)
- James Hasty (2007)
- Brock Huard (2008–2011, 2015–2018)
- Craig James (2009–2011)
- Paul Maguire (2006–2008)
- Todd McShay (2014–2021)
- Urban Meyer (2011)
- Matt Millen (2009–2014)
- David Norrie (2006–2009)
- J. C. Pearson (2010–2011)
- Jordan Rodgers (2023–2025)
- Chris Spielman (2007–2015)
- Kelly Stouffer (2012, 2015)
- Tommy Tuberville (2017)
- Andre Ware (2006)
- Todd Blackledge (2008–2022)
- Dan Orlovsky (2017–2022)

==== Sideline reporters ====
- Erin Andrews (2006–2011)
- Jack Arute (2006–2008)
- Bonnie Bernstein (2006–2007)
- Alex Chappell (2016–2018)
- Heather Cox (2008–2015)
- Stacey Dales (2006, 2008)
- Dawn Davenport (2015, 2017–2020 (with SEC Network), 2021)
- Olivia Dekker (2015, 2019)
- Jeannine Edwards (2007–2014)
- Todd Harris (2006–2008)
- Dave LaMont (2006)
- Jessica Mendoza (2008, 2014)
- Samantha Ponder (2011, 2016)
- Jerry Punch (2015–2016)
- Tom Rinaldi (2014–2020)
- Laura Rutledge (2014–2015, 2018–2021)
- Lisa Salters (2006–2011)
- Joe Schad (2007)
- Marty Smith (2015–2016)
- Shelley Smith (2009–2013)
- Shannon Spake (2013, 2015)
- Maria Taylor (2012–2013, 2014–2015 (with SEC Network), 2017–2020)
- Vince Welch (2007)
- Allison Williams (2015–2020)
- Tiffany Blackmon (2022)
- Molly McGrath (2017–2025)

==== Studio hosts ====
- John Saunders (2006–2015)
- Matt Winer (2006–2009)
- Robert Flores (2009–2014)
- Cassidy Hubbarth (2015–2019)
- Stan Verrett (2016)

==== Studio analysts ====
- Craig James (2006–2008)
- Doug Flutie (2006–2008)
- Jesse Palmer (2009–2013)
- Mack Brown (2014–2018)
- Danny Kanell (2014)
- Mark May (2015–2016)
- Jonathan Vilma (2018–2019)
- Mark Sanchez (2019–2020)
- Dan Orlovsky (2023–2025)

== ABC Sports personalities ==
Note: From 1978 through 1983, ABC broadcast Division I-AA games on select weekends with local sportscasting crews – those are not reflected in this list

=== Play-by-play ===
- Mel Allen (1960–1961)
- Steve Alvarez (1989)
- Red Barber (1966)
- Gary Bender (1982, 1987–1991)
- Larry Birletti (1966, 1968)
- Bud Campbell (1968–1970)
- Rich Cellini (2001)
- Eric Collins (2002–2003)
- Dave Diles (1972)
- Dan Dierdorf (1992–1993)
- Jack Drees (1954)
- Bill Flemming (1960, 1966–1983)
- Bob Gallagher (1966)
- Terry Gannon (1993–2005)
- Gary Gerould (1995, 2004)
- Frank Gifford (1991)
- Curt Gowdy (1960–1961, 1982–1983)
- Steve Grad (1981–1983)
- Sean Grande (2000–2001)
- Merle Harmon (1968–1970, 1973)
- Jim Healy (1966)
- Derrin Horton (2002)
- Keith Jackson (1966–1969, 1971–2006)
- Charlie Jones (1999–2001)
- Mark Jones (1991–1999)
- Dave LaMont (2005)
- Jim Lampley (1974–1980)
- Chris Lincoln (1976–1981)
- Dan Lovett (1975)
- Verne Lundquist (1974–1981)
- Sal Marchiano (1974)
- Dave Martin (1967)
- Sean McDonough (2000–2003)
- Jim McIntyre (1966)
- Jim McKay (1967)
- Corey McPherrin (1984, 1986)
- Joel Meyers (1996)
- Al Michaels (1977–1985, 1988, 1991–1992)
- Bob Murphy (1971–1980)
- Brent Musburger (1990–2005)
- Stu Nahan (1975)
- Brad Nessler (1997–2005)
- Bill O'Donnell (1969)
- Paul Page (2005)
- Greg Papa (1996)
- Ron Pinkney (1976–1977)
- Jerry Punch (2003–2005)
- Jack Rainbolt (1966)
- Lynn Sanner (1968–1974)
- Chris Schenkel (1966–1978, 1988)
- Tom Schoendienst (1970)
- Lon Simmons (1966)
- Jim Simpson (1961)
- Chip Tarkenton (2000)
- Gary Thorne (2003–2005)
- Mike Tirico (1999–2005)
- Al Trautwig (1985)
- Roger Twibell (1992–1999)
- George Walsh (1950)
- Rich Waltz (1998–1999)
- Steve Zabriskie (1976–1982, 1991–1997)

=== Game analysts ===
- Mike Adamle (1986–1989)
- Bob Anderson (1969)
- Jamal Anderson (2004–2005)
- Ray Bentley (2003–2005)
- Dean Blevins (1993–1999)
- Todd Blackledge (1994–1998)
- Terry Bowden (2004–2005)
- Tim Brant (1982–1987, 1991–2005)
- Terry Brennan (1966–1967)
- Frank Broyles (1977–1985)
- Ron Burton (1969)
- Harry Carson (1994)
- Paul Christman (1960–1961)
- Ed Cunningham (2000–2005)
- Fran Curci (1982–1984)
- Gary Danielson (1997–2005)
- Duffy Daugherty (1973–1976)
- Steve Davis (1976–1981)
- Dan Dierdorf (1992–1993)
- John Dockery (1978–1980)
- Forest Evashevski (1970–1974)
- Doug Flutie (1997)
- Rick Forzano (1976–1983)
- Dan Fouts (1997–1999, 2002–2005)
- Russ Francis (1981)
- Irving Fryar (2002)
- Tom Gatewood (1981–1983)
- Rod Gilmore (1998)
- Bob Golic (1999)
- Mike Golic (1997, 1999, 2003–2004)
- Rosey Grier (1968)
- Bob Griese (1987–2005)
- Lee Grosscup (1967–1986)
- Ralph Guglielmi (1968)
- Tom Harmon (1954)
- Mark Herrmann (2000–2001)
- Brian Holloway (1995–1996)
- Stan Humphries (1998)
- Jackie Jensen (1966–1969)
- Ron Johnson (1977)
- Joe Kapp (1972)
- Nick Lowery (1999)
- Johnny Lujack (1968)
- Ben Martin (1978–1981)
- Mike Mayock (2001–2003)
- Jack Mildren (1976)
- David M. Nelson (1968–1973)
- David Norrie (2000–2003)
- Jim Owens (1975)
- Ara Parseghian (1975–1981)
- Clarence Peaks (1972)
- Don Perkins (1975–1976)
- Ron Pitts (1993)
- Tom Ramsey (2005)
- Gary Reasons (1994–1997)
- Dan Reeves (2004)
- Reggie Rivers (2000–2001)
- Pepper Rodgers (1980–1981)
- Darrell Royal (1980–1981)
- Bo Schembechler (1992–1993)
- John Spagnola (1991–1998)
- Monty Stickles (1973–1974)
- Lynn Swann (1983–2005)
- Spencer Tillman (1998)
- Dick Vermeil (1988–1996)
- Everson Walls (1994)
- Paul Warfield (1979–1980)
- Bud Wilkinson (1966–1977)
- John Yovicsin (1971)

=== Sideline reporters ===
- Steve Alvarez (1987–1989)
- Jack Arute (1984–2005)
- Becky Dixon (1986–1988)
- Leslie Gudel (2000–2001)
- Jim Gray (2004)
- Todd Harris (1999–2005)
- Lewis Johnson (1995–1997)
- Mark Jones (1990)
- Trenni Kusnierek (2005)
- Dave LaMont (2004–2005)
- Cheryl Miller (1989–1991)
- Julie Moran (1992-1993)
- Mark Morgan (2004–2005)
- John Naber (1993)
- Jerry Punch (2004)
- Sam Ryan (2002–2005)
- Anne Simon (1982)
- Suzy Shuster (2004–2005)
- Chip Tarkenton (1995, 1999)
- Al Trautwig (1985–1986)
- Scott Walker (2005)
- Vince Welch (2004–2005)

=== Studio hosts ===
- Bud Palmer (1966–1971)
- Merle Harmon (1969–1972)
- Dave Diles (1972–1981)
- Warner Wolf (1975–1976)
- Andrea Kirby (1977–1978)
- Chris Schenkel (1979–1980)
- Jack Whitaker (1982–1984)
- Jim Lampley (1981–1987)
- Jim Hill (1987)
- Al Trautwig (1988)
- Roger Twibell (1989–1991)
- John Saunders (1992–2005)

=== Studio analysts ===
- Beano Cook (1982–1985)
- Bo Schembechler (1991)
- Todd Blackledge (1996–1998)
- Terry Bowden (1999–2003)
- Craig James (2003–2005)
- Aaron Taylor (2004–2005)

== See also ==
- ESPN College Football
- AT&T SportsNet
- Big Ten Network
- CBS Sports Network
- College Football Final
- College football on television
- College Football on NBC Sports
- College Football Scoreboard
- ESPN College Football Primetime
- Pac-12 Network
- SEC Network
- ACC Network
- Spectrum Sports
- Stadium
