= College Football Countdown =

- Genre: Pre-game show
- Presented by: Various commentators
- Theme music composer: John Colby (main theme); Bob Christianson (SEC home games only)
- Opening theme: ESPN College Football theme (main theme); SEC on ABC theme (SEC home games only)
- Ending theme: Same as opening
- Country of origin: United States
- Original language: English
- No. of seasons: 46 (through 2026 season)

Production
- Production locations: Various NCAA stadiums (game telecasts); ESPN Headquarters; Bristol, Connecticut, U.S. (pre-game, halftime and post-game shows); ABC and ESPN Studio; 7 Hudson Square, Manhattan, New York City (alternate pre-game, halftime and post-game shows)
- Camera setup: Multi-camera
- Running time: 30 minutes
- Production companies: National Collegiate Athletic Association; ABC Sports (1981–2006); ESPN (2006–present)

Original release
- Network: ABC
- Release: September 1, 1981 – present

Related
- College Football on ABC; College GameDay; Saturday Night Football

College Football Countdown is a college football television show that typically airs at 3:00 p.m. ET on Saturday afternoons during football season on ABC. The programs precede game action on the network and have been doing so ever since September 1, 1981. College Football Countdown is a presentation of the American Broadcasting Company's (ABC) regular season American college football television package.

== Hosts ==
- Jim Lampley: (1981–1987)
- Al Trautwig: (1988)
- Roger Twibell: (1989–1991)
- John Saunders: (1992–2015)
- Stan Verrett: (2016)
- Kevin Negandhi: (2017–present)

== Analysts ==
- Beano Cook: (1982–1985)
- Bo Schembechler: (1991)
- Todd Blackledge: (1996–1998)
- Terry Bowden: (1999–2003)
- Craig James: (2003–2008)
- Aaron Taylor: (2004–2005)
- Doug Flutie: (2006–2008)
- Jesse Palmer: (2009–2013)
- Mack Brown: (2014–2018)
- Danny Kanell: (2014)
- Mark May: (2015–2016)
- Booger McFarland: (2017 and 2020–present)
- Jonathan Vilma: (2018–2019)
- Mark Sanchez: (2019–2020)
- Dan Orlovsky: (2023–2025)
- Jordan Rodgers: (2026–present)
