= Association of Professional Ball Players of America =

American nonprofit organization

The Association of Professional Ball Players of America (APBPA) is a United States–based charity set up in 1924 to assist professional baseball players. The organization caters to players from all leagues, including the minor leagues. The organization was started by 12 former players in Los Angeles and now has over 101,000 members. Babe Ruth, Lou Gehrig, and other stars of the 1920s spearheaded the development of the APBPA to help former players who were in need financially or experiencing illness or injuries.

== History ==
The proceeds from the 1934 Major League Baseball (MLB) All-Star Game, which was estimated at $45,000–50,000 (equivalent to $1,116,486 in 2024), went to the APBPA. The 1935 MLB All-Star Game in Cleveland, Ohio took in $92,692 (equivalent to $2,125,842 in 2024) in proceeds for the APBPA. In 1941, the Pacific Coast League (PCL) held its first annual PCL All-Star Game and the proceeds for the game were donated to the APBPA.

In 1982, the Old Timers Baseball Classic was created. The event, which was a game between two teams made up of retired baseball players, was sponsored by Cracker Jack and took place in Washington, D.C., at Robert F. Kennedy Memorial Stadium. Part of the proceeds from the game, which was attended by 29,196 people, went to the APBPA. The game became an annual event and parts of the games proceeds went to the APBPA until at least 1989.

A 1986 profile of the APBPA by Los Angeles Times sportswriter Chris Dufresne detailed acts of charity by the organization and expounded upon how they distributed funds. Players were allowed to start taking assistance before their Major League Baseball Players Association pension kicked in at 45 years of age.

The APBPA accepts membership dues from professional baseball players and issues membership cards. Pete Coscarart was issued an APBPA "Gold Card" which allowed him free admittance to professional baseball games per club courtesy.

An award given out by the APBPA known as the Chuck Stevens Award, named for the organization's former secretary-treasurer, is given out annually to the best minor league baseball player from Southern California. The association currently offers assistance for former players with problems with medical issues.

Kameron Loe serves APBPA as a Board Member and President of the Association providing leadership and direction as the Association approaches its 100th anniversary in 2024. The 2024 APBPA Board of Directors is composed further of Orel Hershiser, Mark Grace, Manny Parra, Kevin Simmons, Gerald Smiley, Steve Bumbry, Tony La Russa, Nick Corso, Dr. Erin Shannon, Howie Bedell, and Peter Weinstein.

The APBPA does not publicize their charity work for the privacy of its members.
