= Football Writers Association of America =

Organization of college football media members in the United States

Football Writers Association logo

The Football Writers Association of America (FWAA) is an organization of college football media members in the United States founded in 1941.

== History and operations ==
It is composed of approximately 1,200 professional sports writers from both print and Internet media outlets. The membership includes journalists, broadcasters and publicists, as well as key executives in all the areas that involve the game.

The FWAA works to govern areas that include game day operations, and strives for better working conditions for sports writers in college football press boxes, and deals with access issues to college athletes and coaches. The FWAA also sponsors scholarships for aspiring writers and an annual writing contest.

The FWAA is one of the organizations whose College Football All-America Team is recognized by the NCAA. The organization also selects the Eddie Robinson Coach of the Year, the Bronko Nagurski Trophy winner, the Outland Trophy winner, a freshman All-America team, and weekly defensive player of the week, as well as developing scholarship programs and surveys for better working conditions. From 1954 to 2013, the association awarded the Grantland Rice Trophy to the college football team they chose to be the National Champion.

=== All-America Committees ===
The Football Writers Association of America All-America Committee selects the 25-man All-America Team and the winners of the Bronko Nagurski and Outland trophies. In the spring, the committee selects the FWAA All-America Watch List and the watch lists for both of the FWAA's major player awards. The FWAA has chosen an All-America Team annually since the 1944 season; it is the second longest continuously-published team in major college football.

==== 2009 Committee ====
- John Davis, Oxford (Miss.) Eagle
- Heather Dinich, ESPN.com
- Pete DiPrimio, Fort Wayne (Ind.) News-Sentinel
- Dennis Dodd, CBSSports.com
- Ryan Finley, Arizona Daily Star
- Pete Fiutak, College Football News
- Kevin Gorman, Pittsburgh Tribune-Review
- Anthony Hanshew, The Herald-Dispatch
- Dave Matter, Columbia (Mo.) Daily Tribune
- Mick McGrane, The San Diego Union-Tribune
- Rodney McKissic, The Buffalo News
- Adam Sparks, The Daily News Journal
- Phil Steele, Phil Steele Publications
- Jimmy Watson, Shreveport Times

==== 2008 Committee ====
- Bob Asmussen, Champaign News-Gazette
- Frank Coyle, draftinsiders.com
- Chadd Cripe, Idaho Statesman
- Dennis Dodd, CBSSports.com
- Joseph Duarte, Houston Chronicle
- Antonya English, St. Petersburg Times
- Maureen Fulton, Toledo Blade
- Bob Holt, Arkansas Democrat-Gazette
- Tom Kensler, Denver Post
- Lenn Robbins, New York Post
- George Schroeder, Eugene Register-Guard
- Phil Steele, Phil Steele Publications
- Paul Strelow, The State
- Phil Stukenborg, The Commercial Appeal

==== 2007 Committee ====
- Mark Blaudschun, The Boston Globe
- Chip Brown, The Dallas Morning News
- Bob Clark, Eugene Register-Guard
- Buddy Davis, Ruston Daily Leader
- Dennis Dodd, CBSSports.com
- Bob Holt, Arkansas Democrat-Gazette
- Steve Irvine, Birmingham News
- Michael Lewis, Salt Lake Tribune
- Matt Markey, Toledo Blade
- Brett McMurphy, Tampa Tribune

==== 2006 Committee ====
- Eric Bailey, Tulsa World
- Chad Cripe, Idaho Statesman
- Scott Ferrell, Shreveport Times
- Robert Gagliardi, Wyoming Tribune-Eagle
- Eric Hansen, South Bend Tribune
- Andrew Logue, Des Moines Register
- Tom Luicci, Newark Star-Ledger
- Jeff Metcalfe, Arizona Republic
- George Schroeder, Daily Oklahoman
- Norm Wood, Daily Press

=== Armed Forces Merit Award ===
The Armed Forces Merit Award was established by the FWAA in 2012 "to honor an individual and/or a group with a military background and/or involvement that has an impact within the realm of college football." The winners are as follows:

2012: Nate Boyer, LS, Texas
2013: Brandon McCoy, DE, North Texas
2014: Daniel Rodriguez, WR, Clemson
2015: Bret Robertson, SS, Westminster (MO)
2016: Steven Rhodes, DE, Middle Tennessee State
2017: Kansas State Wildcats football
2018: Christopher B. Howard, President, Robert Morris University
2019: Mike Viti, Coach, Army
2020: Collin O'Donnell, Bluefield
2021: Damian Jackson, LB, Nebraska
2022: Paris Johnson Jr. Foundation
2023: Tyler Huff, QB, Furman
2024: Jack Hawkins Jr., Chancellor, Troy University
2025: Levi Moell, RB, Dayton

=== Bert McGrane Award winners ===
Presented to a member of the FWAA for "outstanding contribution to the organization".

1974: Charley Johnson, Minneapolis Star
1975: Wilfrid Smith, Chicago Tribune
1976: Paul Zimmerman, Los Angeles Times
1977: Dick Cullum, Minneapolis Tribune
1978: Wilbur Evans, Cotton Bowl Athletic Association
1979: Tom Siler, Knoxville News-Sentinel
1980: Maury White, Des Moines Register
1981: Fred Russell, Nashville Banner
1982: Furman Bisher, Atlanta Journal
1983: John Mooney, Salt Lake Tribune
1984: Si Burick, Dayton News
1985: Blackie Sherrod, The Dallas Morning News
1986: Raymond Johnson, Nashville Tennessean
1987: Tim Cohane, Look
1988: Dave Campbell, Waco Tribune-Herald
1989: Jim Brock, Cotton Bowl Athletic Association
1990: Jack Hairston, Gainesville Sun
1991: Murray Olderman, Newspaper Enterprise Association
1992: Volney Meece, The Daily Oklahoman
1993: Bob Hentzen, The Topeka Capital-Journal
1994: Edgar Allen, Nashville Journal
1995: Dick Herbert, Raleigh News & Observer
1996: Bob Hammel, Bloomington Herald-Times
1997: Bill Lumpkin, Birmingham Post-Herald
1998: Don Bryant, University of Nebraska–Lincoln
1999: Field Scovell, Cotton Bowl Athletic Association
2000: Jimmie McDowell, All-American Football Foundation
2001: Edwin Pope, Miami Herald
2002: Orville Henry, Arkansas Democrat-Gazette
2003: Dan Foster, The Greenville News
2004: Pat Harmon, Cincinnati Post
2005: Steve Richardson, FWAA
2006: John Junker, Tostitos Fiesta Bowl
2007: Mark Blaudschun, The Boston Globe
2008: Claude Felton, University of Georgia
2009: Tony Barnhart, Atlanta Journal-Constitution
2010: Tom Mickle, Florida Citrus Sports
2011: Beano Cook, ESPN/University of Pittsburgh
2012: Dave Sittler, Tulsa World
2013: Dick Weiss, New York Daily News
2014: Tim Tessalone, University of Southern California
2015: Steve Hatchell, National Football Foundation
2016: Ivan Maisel, ESPN.com
2017: Charlie Fiss, Cotton Bowl Athletic Association
2018: Steve Wieberg, USA Today (1982–2012)
2019: Blair Kerkhoff, The Kansas City Star
2020: Wally Hall, Arkansas Democrat-Gazette
2021: John Heisler, University of Notre Dame
2022: Dennis Dodd, CBS Sports
2023: Chris Dufresne, Los Angeles Times
2024: Kirk Bohls, Austin American-Statesman

=== All-Time Teams ===
Selected by the Football Writers Association of America for the centennial year of college football in 1969. An Early Era team was chosen that featured Jim Thorpe, a modern team (1919–68) and a Quarter-Century team that was chosen in 1993, 25 years after the college football centennial celebration.

==== 1969–1994 All-America Team ====
Offense
C – Dave Rimington, Nebraska
G – John Hannah, Alabama
G – Dean Steinkuhler, Nebraska
T – Bill Fralic, Pittsburgh
T – Jerry Sisemore, Texas
TE – Keith Jackson, Oklahoma
WR – Anthony Carter, Michigan
WR – Jerry Rice, Mississippi Valley State
QB – John Elway, Stanford
RB – Tony Dorsett, Pittsburgh
RB – Herschel Walker, Georgia
K – Tony Franklin, Texas A&M
KR – Johnny Rodgers, Nebraska

Defense
DE – Lee Roy Selmon, Oklahoma
DE – Jack Youngblood, Florida
DT – Steve Emtman, Washington
DT – Randy White, Maryland
LB – Hugh Green, Pittsburgh
LB – Lawrence Taylor, North Carolina
MLB – Mike Singletary, Baylor
DB – Deion Sanders, Florida State
DB – Ronnie Lott, USC
DB – Jack Tatum, Ohio State
DB – Kenny Easley, UCLA
P – Ray Guy, Southern Miss

==== 1919–1968 Modern Era All-America Team ====
E – Bennie Oosterbaan, Michigan
E – Don Hutson, Alabama
L – Bronko Nagurski, Minnesota
L – Bruiser Kinard, Ole Miss
L – Jim Parker, Ohio State
L – Bob Suffridge, Tennessee
C – Mel Hein, Washington State
B – Sammy Baugh, TCU
B – Jay Berwanger, Chicago
B – Ernie Nevers, Stanford
B – Red Grange, Illinois

==== 1869–1918 Early Era All-America Team ====
E – Frank Hinkey, Yale
E – Huntington Hardwick, Harvard
T – Josh Cody, Vanderbilt
T – Wilbur Henry, Washington & Jefferson
G – Pudge Heffelfinger, Yale
G – Truxtun Hare, Penn
C – Germany Schulz, Michigan
B – Jim Thorpe, Carlisle
B – Elmer Oliphant, Purdue
B – Willie Heston, Michigan
B – Walter Eckersall, Chicago

==== 75th-Anniversary All-America Team ====
To celebrate the 75th anniversary of its formation in 2015, the Football Writers Association of America selected a 75th Anniversary All-America Team.

===== First Team =====
Offense
QB – Roger Staubach, Navy
RB – Archie Griffin, Ohio State
RB – Herschel Walker, Georgia
WR – Larry Fitzgerald, Pittsburgh
WR – Jerry Rice, Mississippi Valley State
TE – Keith Jackson, Oklahoma
OL – John Hannah, Alabama
OL – Orlando Pace, Ohio State
OL – Will Shields, Nebraska
OL – Ron Yary, USC
C – Dave Rimington, Nebraska

Defense
DT – Lee Roy Selmon, Oklahoma
DT – Ndamukong Suh, Nebraska
DE – Leon Hart, Notre Dame
DE – Ted Hendricks, Miami
LB – Tommy Nobis, Texas
LB – Mike Singletary, Baylor
LB – Derrick Thomas, Alabama
DB – Ronnie Lott, USC
DB – Deion Sanders, Florida State
DB – Jack Tatum, Ohio State
DB – Charles Woodson, Michigan

Specialists
P – Ray Guy, Southern Miss
K – Kevin Butler, Georgia
RS – Johnny Rodgers, Nebraska

===== Second Team =====
Offense
QB – Tim Tebow, Florida
RB – Tony Dorsett, Pittsburgh
RB – Barry Sanders, Oklahoma State
WR – Fred Biletnikoff, Florida State
WR – Randy Moss, Marshall
TE – Mike Ditka, Pittsburgh
OL – Bill Fralic, Pittsburgh
OL – John Hicks, Ohio State
OL – Calvin Jones, Iowa
OL – Jonathan Ogden, UCLA
C – Chuck Bednarik, Penn

Defense
DT – Merlin Olsen, Utah State
DT – Randy White, Maryland
DE – Hugh Green, Pittsburgh
DE – Bruce Smith, Virginia Tech
LB – Brian Bosworth, Oklahoma
LB – Dick Butkus, Illinois
LB – Luke Kuechly, Boston College
DB – Champ Bailey, Georgia
DB – Kenny Easley, UCLA
DB – Jerry Gray, Texas
DB – Ed Reed, Miami

Specialists
P – Russell Erxleben, Texas
K – Mason Crosby, Colorado
RS – Raghib Ismail, Notre Dame

===== Third Team =====
Offense
QB – Tommie Frazier, Nebraska
RB – Bo Jackson, Auburn
RB – Doak Walker, SMU
WR – Anthony Carter, Michigan
WR – Calvin Johnson, Georgia Tech
TE – Gordon Hudson, BYU
OL – Barrett Jones, Alabama
OL – Willie Roaf, Louisiana Tech
OL – Jerry Sisemore, Texas
OL – Dean Steinkuhler, Nebraska
C – Jim Ritcher, N.C. State

Defense
DT – Steve Emtman, Washington
DT – Reggie White, Tennessee
DE – Bubba Smith, Michigan State
DE – Jack Youngblood, Florida
LB – Jack Ham, Penn State
LB – Lee Roy Jordan, Alabama
LB – Chris Spielman, Ohio State
DB – Dré Bly, North Carolina
DB – Dave Brown, Michigan
DB – Troy Polamalu, USC
DB – Roy Williams, Oklahoma

Specialists
P – Rohn Stark, Florida State
K – Tony Franklin, Texas A&M
RS – Derek Abney, Kentucky

=== Awards sponsored ===
See footnote

Currently the FWAA sponsors seven awards and those are affiliated with the National College Football Awards Association (NCFAA).

- All-America and Freshman All-America Teams
- Bronko Nagurski Trophy
- Outland Trophy
- Grantland Rice Trophy
- Eddie Robinson Coach of the Year
- FedEx Orange Bowl Courage Award
- Tostitos Fiesta Bowl National Team of the Week

=== Poll ===
Beginning in 2014, 26 members of the FWAA will vote in a new poll in partnership with the National Football Foundation. It is called the FWAA-NFF Grantland Rice Super 16 Poll.

== See also ==
- Pro Football Writers Association
- National Collegiate Baseball Writers Association
- Baseball Writers' Association of America
- United States Basketball Writers Association (college)
- Pro Basketball Writers Association
- Professional Hockey Writers Association
- National Sports Media Association
