= College GameDay (football TV program) =

American television program

- 2025 logo
- Presented by: Rece Davis
- Starring: Kirk Herbstreit; Desmond Howard; Pat McAfee; Nick Saban; Jen Lada; Jess Sims; Pete Thamel; Steve "Stanford Steve" Coughlin; Katie Feeney
- Opening theme: "Comin' to Your City" by Big & Rich (performed by Darius Rucker, Lainey Wilson, and The Cadillac Three)
- Country of origin: United States

Production
- Production locations: Bristol, Connecticut (1987–2002); On location (1993–present)
- Running time: 180 minutes

Original release
- Network: ESPN
- Release: September 5, 1987 – present

Related
- College Football on ESPN

College GameDay (branded as ESPN College GameDay built by The Home Depot for sponsorship reasons) is a pre-game show broadcast by ESPN as part of the network's coverage of college football, broadcast on Saturday mornings during the college football season. In its current form, the program is typically broadcast from the campus of the team hosting a featured game being played that day and features news and analysis of the day's upcoming games.

The show manufactures a festive tailgate party atmosphere, as thousands of fans gather behind the broadcast set, in view of the show's cameras. Many fans bring flags or hand-painted signs as well, and the school's cheerleaders and mascots often join in the celebration. Crowds at GameDay tapings are known to be quite boisterous and very spirited. Flags seen at the broadcast are not limited to those of the home team; for example, one large Washington State flag can be seen at every broadcast, regardless of the location or the teams involved. The idea began in 2003 on WSU online fan forums and has resulted in the flag, nicknamed "Ol' Crimson", being present at 320 consecutive GameDay broadcasts since 2003.

The show is known for its prediction segment that appears at the end of each broadcast. The predictions use the standard scoring system and do not use the spread in determining the pick. Typically there are six predictors: Lee Corso (who retired shortly after the start of the 2025 season), Kirk Herbstreit, Desmond Howard, Nick Saban, Pat McAfee, and an invited guest, usually a celebrity, prominent athlete, or radio personality associated with the host school for that week. From 1987 until his retirement in 2025, the show concluded with Corso's prediction for the host school's game, after which he dons the mascot's headgear of the team he predicts to win the game, usually to the ire or excitement of local fans. His first headgear pick occurred on October 5, 1996, when he correctly picked the Ohio State Buckeyes over the Penn State Nittany Lions. Corso made his 431st and final headgear pick on August 30, 2025, correctly picking Ohio State to defeat the Texas Longhorns.

As of October 10, 2026, Ohio State–Penn State, Alabama–LSU, and Alabama–Georgia are the most featured matchups, appearing thirteen times on College GameDay. Ohio State has the most hosts, appearances, and wins; Alabama is second in all three categories.

== Format ==
=== Staff ===
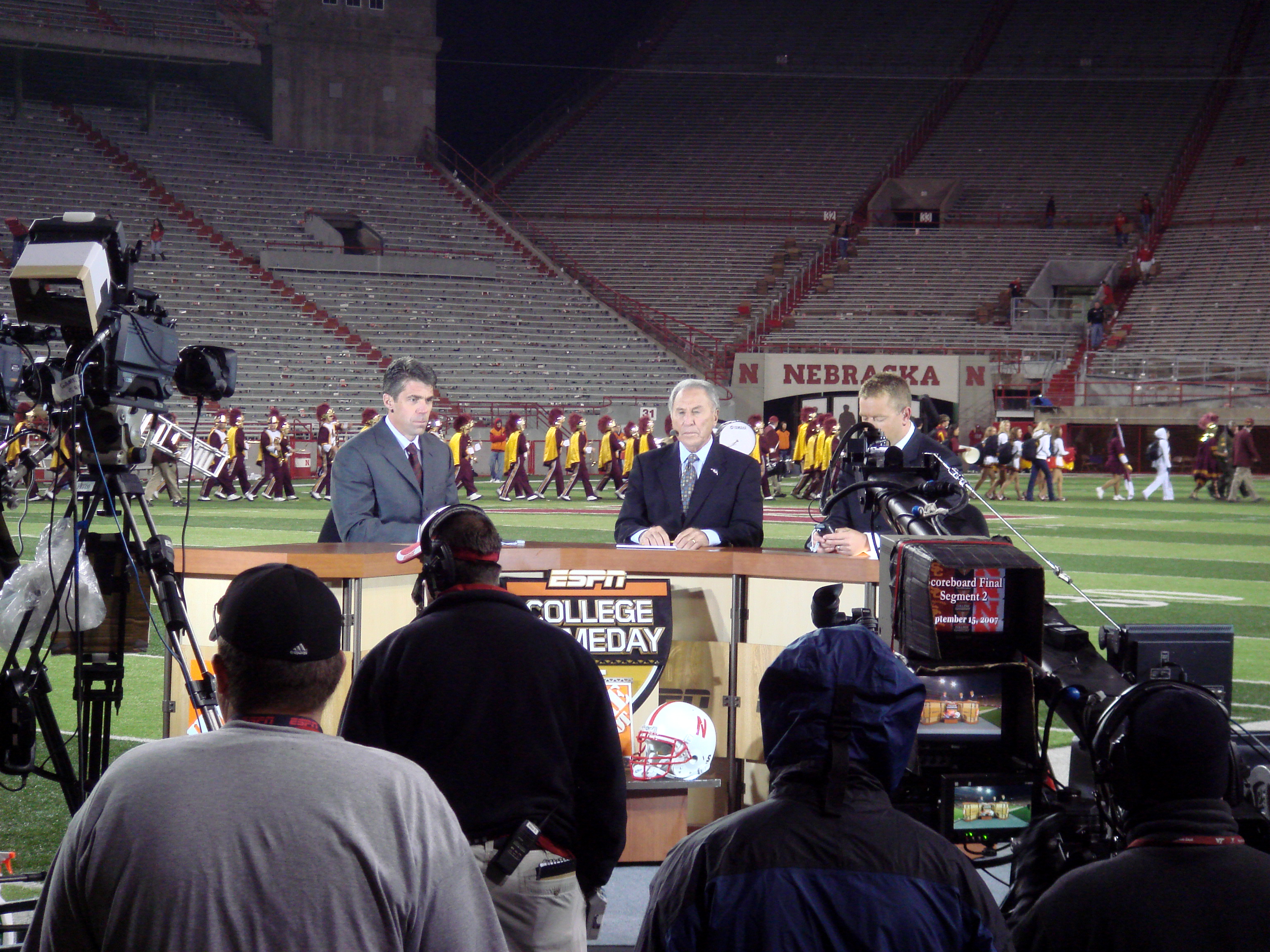
The GameDay crew record a post-game segment for SportsCenter at Nebraska (vs. USC) on September 15, 2007.

Tim Brando was the original host, with Lee Corso and Beano Cook as commentators. Karie Ross soon became the first woman to join the broadcast. The show underwent a radical transformation beginning in 1993, and began incorporating live broadcasts. The longest-tenured original cast member was Lee Corso, whose appearances were pre-scripted after he suffered a stroke in 2009. Rece Davis serves as host and Kirk Herbstreit is the longest-tenured current cast member, having joined the show in 1996. Desmond Howard was added to the cast of the show in 2008. Craig James served as an analyst from 1990 to 1995. Erin Andrews joined the GameDay crew as a co-host and contributor in 2010, replaced in 2012 by Samantha Ponder (and in 2017 by Maria Taylor after Ponder left to become host of Sunday NFL Countdown that same year). In 2015, Rece Davis (also host of the college basketball version of GameDay) replaced Chris Fowler as host of the show. In 2022, Pat McAfee joined, having previously been an analyst, and Nick Saban was added to the show in 2024. Corso retired from GameDay after the August 30, 2025 broadcast. In 2010, the program started airing from 10:00am to 11:00am, with the opening hour broadcast on ESPNU until the present.

In 2023, ESPN laid off a large number of on-air staff, including College GameDay hosts Gene Wojciechowski and David Pollack.

==== Current ====
- Rece Davis: host, 2015–present
- Kirk Herbstreit: analyst, 1996–present
- Desmond Howard: analyst, 2005–present
- Pat McAfee: contributor, 2019–2020; analyst, 2022–present
- Nick Saban: analyst, 2024–present
- Jen Lada: reporter, 2016–present
- Jess Sims: reporter, 2022–present
- Pete Thamel: insider, 2022–present
- Steve "Stanford Steve" Coughlin: sports betting analyst, 2023–present
- Katie Feeney: contributor, 2025–present

==== Former ====
- Trev Alberts: in-studio analyst, 2002–2005
- Erin Andrews: reporter/contributor, 2010–2011
- Tim Brando: host, 1987–1988
- Bob Carpenter: host, 1989
- Beano Cook: analyst, 1987–1990
- Lee Corso: analyst, 1987–2025
- Chris "Bear" Fallica: researcher/contributor, 1996–2022
- Chris Fowler: host, 1990–2014
- Robert Griffin III: contributor, 2021–2022
- Craig James: analyst, 1990–1995
- Rocket Ismail: contributor, 2003–2004
- Nick Lachey: contributor, 2005
- Norm Hitzges: contributor, 1992–1995
- David Pollack: analyst/contributor, 2011–2022
- Samantha Ponder: reporter/contributor, 2012–2016
- Tom Rinaldi: contributor, 2011–2020
- Maria Taylor: reporter/contributor, 2017–2020
- Gene Wojciechowski: contributor, 1992–2022

=== Music ===
The show's current main intro and theme music is performed by country music group the Cadillac Three, featuring country singers Darius Rucker and Lainey Wilson, who perform the 2005 crossover hit "Comin' to Your City" by Big & Rich, which features revised lyrics which mention several top college teams. Big & Rich had performed the song, which featured a guest appearance by Cowboy Troy until 2022. Rap artist Travie McCoy (of Gym Class Heroes) appeared in the intro from the 2014 season until the 2017 season alongside Lzzy Hale, lead vocalist and guitarist of the rock group Halestorm. The 2018 through 2022 season featured rock artist ZZ Ward, replacing Hale. Additional music that has been used for the show include "Boom" by the rock group P.O.D. and God Bless Saturday by Kid Rock. The show also uses various other songs/music either side of commercial breaks, such as Saturday by Twenty-One Pilots which leads into the programme's first commercial break.

=== Lee Corso headgear picks ===
Lee Corso made his first headgear pick on October 5, 1996, when he correctly picked the Ohio State Buckeyes over the Penn State Nittany Lions. His final headgear pick came on August 30, 2025, where he also correctly picked the Ohio State Buckeyes to defeat the Texas Longhorns. Ohio State has the most selections with 46 picks and also has the most wins with 32. USC holds the highest win percentage, winning all 17 games in which they were picked by Corso.

School	Total times picked	Record	Win %
Ohio State	46	32–14	.696
Alabama	38	28–10	.737
LSU	25	18–7	.720
Florida	22	15–7	.682
Oregon	21	14–7	.667
Florida State	19	13–6	.684
Oklahoma	18	11–7	.611
Texas	18	10–8	.556
USC	17	17–0	1.000
Notre Dame	16	11–5	.688
Michigan	15	10–5	.667
Clemson	14	11–3	.786
Georgia	14	9–5	.643
Navy	10	4–6	.400
Miami (FL)	9	7–2	.778
Tennessee	8	6–2	.750
Penn State	7	5–2	.714
Wisconsin	7	3–4	.429
Auburn	6	4–2	.667
Kansas State	6	2–4	.333
TCU	6	5–1	.833
Nebraska	5	3–2	.600
Michigan State	4	3–1	.750
Oklahoma State	4	1–3	.250
Virginia Tech	4	4–0	1.000
Washington	4	2–2	.500
Air Force	3	2–1	.667
Iowa	3	1–2	.333
James Madison	3	1–2	.333
North Dakota State	3	3–0	1.000
Pitt	3	2–1	.667
Stanford	3	2–1	.667
South Carolina	3	1–2	.333
Texas A&M	3	1–2	.333
UCLA	3	1–2	.333
Utah	3	2–1	.667
Baylor	2	0–2	.000
Colorado	2	1–1	.500
Indiana	2	1–1	.500
Louisville	2	1–1	.500
Missouri	2	1–1	.500
Alcorn State	1	0–1	.000
Appalachian State	1	1–0	1.000
Arizona	1	0–1	.000
Arkansas	1	1–0	1.000
Boise State	1	1–0	1.000
Bowling Green	1	1–0	1.000
BYU	1	0–1	.000
Cincinnati	1	1–0	1.000
Florida A&M	1	1–0	1.000
Grambling State	1	1–0	1.000
Houston	1	1–0	1.000
Illinois	1	1–0	1.000
Iowa State	1	0–1	.000
Minnesota	1	0–1	.000
Mississippi State	1	1–0	1.000
Montana State	1	1–0	1.000
North Carolina	1	1–0	1.000
NC State	1	0–1	.000
Ole Miss	1	1–0	1.000
Penn	1	1–0	1.000
Purdue	1	0–1	.000
SMU	1	0–1	.000
Texas Tech	1	1–0	1.000
UCF	1	1–0	1.000
Washington State	1	1–0	1.000
Western Michigan	1	1–0	1.000
Williams	1	1–0	1.000
Yale	1	0–1	.000

=== Celebrity guest pickers ===
Auburn and NBA basketball player Charles Barkley was the first celebrity guest picker on the October 2, 2004, show and has made the most show appearances with six, with his most recent appearance on December 14, 2019. Olympian and Arizona swimmer Amanda Beard was the first female celebrity guest picker on November 21, 2009. Georgia golfer Bubba Watson became the first celebrity picker to pick all games correctly on September 28, 2013. Oklahoma State and NBA player Marcus Smart became the first ever student athlete guest picker on November 23, 2013. The Oregon Duck became the first school mascot to be the guest picker on September 6, 2014. Guests have included athletes, coaches, military veterans, Make-A-Wish Foundation kids, school mascots, professional sports owners, CEOs, singers, actors and celebrity personalities.

Appearances through November 21, 2026:

Celebrity	Appearances	Record	Win %	Last appearance
Charles Barkley	6	23–18	.561	December 14, 2019
Keegan-Michael Key	4	29–16	.644	November 2, 2024
Kenny Chesney	3	11–11	.500	September 27, 2014
Eric Church	3	21–13	.618	September 14, 2019
Mark Cuban	3	14–15	.483	October 9, 2021
Eddie George	3	19–12	.613	August 28, 2021
Lane Kiffin	3	16–7	.696	November 13, 2021
Joel McHale	3	21–10	.677	October 14, 2023
Joe Namath	3	21–10	.677	September 9, 2023
Vince Vaughn	3	22–13	.629	September 23, 2023
Nate Bargatze	2	13–6	.684	October 25, 2025
Brian Bosworth	2	5–7	.417	December 19, 2025
Zac Brown	2	11–7	.611	September 4, 2021
Luke Bryan	2	16–6	.727	November 5, 2022
The Chainsmokers	2	13–10	.565	October 13, 2018
Nathan Followill	2	7–12	.368	October 27, 2012
A.J. Hawk	2	9–10	.474	December 21, 2024
Aidan Hutchinson	2	12–7	.632	November 29, 2025
Sabrina Ionescu	2	13–8	.619	October 11, 2025
Bo Jackson	2	17–5	.773	August 31, 2019
Ken Jeong	2	12–8	.600	September 30, 2023
Dwayne "The Rock" Johnson	2	13–7	.650	November 21, 2026
Bill Murray	2	6–8	.429	September 17, 2020
Jack Nicklaus	2	10–7	.588	November 14, 2020
Brad Paisley	2	12–6	.667	September 5, 2015
Glen Powell	2	15–6	.714	September 12, 2026
Rob Riggle	2	7–12	.368	October 8, 2022
Willie Robertson	2	7–12	.368	October 25, 2014
Alex Rodriguez	2	20–4	.833	October 10, 2020
Darius Rucker	2	13–9	.591	September 2, 2023
Roger Staubach	2	4–3	.571	December 12, 2015
Steve Spurrier	2	10–11	.476	September 24, 2016
Eric Stonestreet	2	7–12	.368	August 31, 2013
Theo Von	2	9–7	.563	October 4, 2025
Trae Young	2	13–5	.722	September 6, 2025
Laila Ali	1	5–4	.556	September 17, 2016
Lance Armstrong	1	7–3	.700	September 19, 2009
LaVar Arrington	1	5–5	.500	September 27, 2025
Stone Cold Steve Austin	1	5–4	.556	August 30, 2014
Bob Baffert	1	7–3	.700	September 26, 2015
Saquon Barkley	1	6–6	.500	September 18, 2021
Amanda Beard	1	4–6	.400	November 21, 2009
Bianca Belair	1	7–4	.636	September 24, 2022
Bill Belichick	1	0–1	.000	December 9, 2023
Matt Birk	1	5–5	.500	November 22, 2014
Dierks Bentley	1	4–4	.500	October 24, 2015
Drew Bledsoe	1	11–3	.786	October 10, 2018
Big Boi	1	8–1	.889	September 6, 2010
Bobby Bowden	1	7–2	.778	September 11, 2010
Drew Brees	1	5–6	.455	October 10, 2009
Alex Bregman	1	7–6	.538	November 3, 2018
Kane Brown	1	9–3	.750	December 4, 2021
Tedy Bruschi	1	6–3	.667	October 3, 2009
Ty Burrell	1	2–3	.400	November 6, 2010
Frank Caliendo	1	8–2	.800	October 29, 2016
Luther Campbell	1	5–4	.556	December 2, 2017
Jim Cantore	1	5–3	.625	October 3, 2015
Ricky Carmichael	1	2–5	.286	September 22, 2012
Ki-Jana Carter	1	8–1	.889	October 10, 2017
Alex Caruso	1	1–2	.333	December 20, 2025
Timothée Chalamet	1	4–3	.571	December 7, 2024
Joey Chestnut	1	5–1	.833	December 7, 2013
Caitlin Clark	1	5–5	.500	October 3, 2026
Dallas Clark	1	2–5	.286	December 5, 2015
Chase Claypool	1	8–2	.800	November 7, 2020
Mateen Cleaves	1	4–5	.444	October 22, 2011
Luke Combs	1	6–6	.500	September 17, 2022
PFT Commenter	1	3–6	.333	November 18, 2023
Alice Cooper	1	8–3	.727	November 8, 2014
Eric Decker	1	6–5	.545	November 30, 2019
Mike Ditka	1	8–2	.800	November 20, 2010
Pete Dawkins	1	3–5	.375	December 18, 2021
Aaron Donald	1	6–3	.667	November 15, 2025
Landon Donovan	1	5–5	.500	November 24, 2012
The Oregon Duck	1	5–3	.625	September 6, 2014
Jeff Dunham	1	4–4	.500	November 14, 2015
Livvy Dunne & Paul Skenes	1	5–4	.556	November 9, 2024
Dale Earnhardt Jr.	1	5–5	.500	September 10, 2016
Ashton Eaton	1	4–5	.444	October 26, 2013
LaVell Edwards	1	7–3	.700	October 24, 2009
Harris English	1	5–5	.500	October 2, 2021
Sir Nick Faldo	1	7–2	.778	November 19, 2022
Chris Fallica	1	4–5	.444	November 16, 2013
Jerry Ferrara	1	5–4	.556	October 1, 2011
Will Ferrell	1	5–5	.500	October 30, 2010
Justin Fields	1	6–4	.600	November 23, 2024
Ric Flair	1	6–4	.600	October 15, 2016
Rickie Fowler	1	7–4	.636	November 28, 2015
Jeff Foxworthy	1	7–4	.636	October 16, 2021
Marcus Freeman	1	0–1	.000	January 19, 2026
Morgan Freeman	1	7–3	.700	September 19, 2026
Phillip Fulmer	1	5–6	.455	September 24, 2016
Chip Gaines & Joanna Gaines	1	4–8	.333	November 16, 2019
Shane Gillis	1	1–0	1.000	December 20, 2024
Bill Goldberg	1	4–0	1.000	December 31, 2021
John Goodman	1	12–1	.923	October 12, 2019
Owen Gray	1	6–5	.545	September 8, 2018
Ken Griffey Jr.	1	6–3	.667	October 18, 2014
Archie Griffin	1	4–6	.400	November 21, 2015
Blake Griffin	1	9–1	.900	October 8, 2011
Draymond Green	1	5–3	.625	September 12, 2015
Jeff Van Gundy	1	4–5	.444	September 8, 2012
Phil Hansen	1	4–5	.444	September 21, 2013
Jack Harlow	1	7–3	.700	September 3, 2022
Mark Harmon	1	3–3	.500	September 7, 2013
Omari Hardwick	1	6–4	.600	October 3, 2020
Bryce Harper	1	11–2	.846	November 24, 2018
Derrick Henry	1	5–6	.455	October 17, 2020
Santonio Holmes	1	5–4	.556	September 12, 2009
Evander Holyfield	1	8–6	.571	October 27, 2018
Bob Huggins	1	7–3	.700	September 3, 2017
Sam Hunt	1	8–1	.889	September 24, 2011
Michael Irvin	1	1–3	.250	August 24, 2019
LeBron James	1	5–5	.500	October 25, 2008
Jeezy	1	7–6	.538	September 21, 2019
Greg Jennings	1	8–2	.800	November 19, 2016
Brock Jensen	1	6–4	.600	September 13, 2014
Dustin Johnson	1	8–2	.800	January 1, 2014
Ernie Johnson	1	4–2	.667	December 6, 2025
Ian Johnson	1	3–6	.333	November 14, 2026
Magic Johnson	1	8–2	.800	December 12, 2020
Chipper Jones	1	5–4	.556	September 5, 2009
Jerry Jones	1	6–1	.857	September 1, 2012
Lolo Jones	1	6–4	.600	November 3, 2012
Toby Keith	1	7–6	.538	October 6, 2018
Dalton Kincaid	1	6–5	.545	October 24, 2026
Bob Knight	1	2–0	1.000	November 1, 2008
Phil Knight	1	7–3	.700	October 31, 2009
Johnny Knoxville	1	2–8	.200	September 26, 2026
Ashton Kutcher	1	6–5	.545	September 11, 2021
Nick Lachey	1	9–3	.750	November 6, 2021
Jerry "The King" Lawler	1	9–3	.750	November 2, 2019
Carl Lewis	1	5–5	.500	November 19, 2011
Ryan Lochte	1	8–2	.800	October 20, 2011
Lyle Lovett	1	5–3	.625	September 14, 2013
Verne Lundquist	1	3–5	.375	October 22, 2016
Marcus Luttrell	1	5–4	.556	November 15, 2014
Marshawn Lynch	1	6–6	.500	October 5, 2024
Patrick Mahomes	1	6–3	.667	November 8, 2025
Sebastian Maniscalco	1	8–4	.667	November 11, 2021
Peyton Manning	1	7–3	.700	October 15, 2022
Johnny Manziel	1	4–3	.571	August 31, 2024
Marcus Mariota	1	3–6	.333	November 22, 2025
Tim Matheson	1	11–5	.688	September 22, 2018
Baker Mayfield	1	9–3	.750	October 7, 2023
Pat McAfee	1	7–7	.500	October 26, 2019
Matthew McConaughey	1	9–2	.818	September 7, 2019
Cadet Cpt. Hugh McConnell	1	3–2	.600	December 10, 2016
Tim McGraw	1	7–1	.875	October 7, 2017
Trace McSorley	1	8–3	.727	October 31, 2020
Warren Moon	1	5–4	.556	October 12, 2013
Brent Musburger	1	4–6	.400	October 5, 2013
Craig T. Nelson	1	7–2	.778	November 18, 2017
Chris O'Donnell	1	10–3	.769	November 10, 2018
Jake Olson	1	6–4	.600	January 1, 2010
Kaitlin Olson	1	6−4	.600	October 12, 2024
Jake Owen	1	9–1	.900	November 2, 2013
Orlando Pace	1	7–3	.700	November 26, 2016
Braden Pape	1	6–5	.545	November 17, 2012
Jonathan Papelbon	1	5–4	.556	October 11, 2014
Candace Parker	1	4–7	.364	September 13, 2025
Danica Patrick	1	8–3	.727	September 25, 2021
Chris Paul	1	3–4	.429	September 12, 2020
Jake Peavy	1	6–3	.667	November 9, 2013
Dude Perfect	1	7–4	.636	November 30, 2024
Katy Perry	1	7–2	.778	October 4, 2014
Phillie Phanatic	1	4–3	.571	October 31, 2015
Michael Phelps	1	4–5	.444	September 7, 2024
Cpt. Stephen Phillips	1	3–2	.600	December 10, 2016
Rick Pitino	1	6–5	.545	September 16, 2017
Jim Plunkett	1	7–3	.700	November 12, 2011
Derek Poundstone	1	6–4	.600	November 13, 2010
Maury Povich	1	9–4	.692	November 11, 2018
Quavo	1	6–5	.545	December 1, 2018
Gabrielle Reece	1	6–4	.600	September 20, 2014
Roman Reigns	1	6–4	.600	September 15, 2018
Cody Rhodes	1	7–3	.700	November 16, 2024
Condoleezza Rice	1	6–3	.667	December 12, 2020
Ryan Riess	1	4–2	.667	December 7, 2013
Jase Robertson	1	9–0	1.000	October 25, 2014
Aaron Rodgers	1	8–2	.800	September 3, 2016
Jelly Roll	1	6–2	.750	October 18, 2025
Rick Ross	1	5–4	.556	November 7, 2015
Matt Ryan	1	6–4	.600	December 1, 2012
Terry Saban	1	7–2	.778	September 28, 2024
Scottie Scheffler	1	7–3	.700	October 19, 2024
Kyle Schwarber	1	8–1	.889	October 26, 2024
Sheamus	1	3–1	.750	August 24, 2024
Lt. Curtis Sharp	1	6–6	.500	November 10, 2012
Blake Shelton	1	5–5	.500	September 21, 2024
Mike Singletary	1	4–3	.571	December 6, 2014
Marcus Smart	1	5–6	.455	November 23, 2013
Alex Smith	1	6–3	.667	November 1, 2025
Bruce Smith	1	7–3	.700	September 30, 2017
Emmitt Smith	1	10–2	.833	October 5, 2019
Nolan Smith	1	9–2	.818	November 11, 2023
Stephen A. Smith	1	6–5	.545	October 29, 2022
Steve Smith, Sr.	1	4–6	.400	October 28, 2023
Hope Solo	1	4–5	.444	October 12, 2013
Lara Spencer	1	9–4	.692	October 19, 2019
Jordan Spieth	1	6–4	.600	November 12, 2022
Dawn Staley	1	9–3	.750	September 14, 2024
John Stockton	1	6–1	.857	October 10, 2015
Picabo Street	1	6–3	.667	September 25, 2010
C. J. Stroud	1	8–3	.727	October 21, 2023
Jason Sudeikis	1	7–2	.778	November 7, 2026
Nick Swisher	1	8–1	.889	November 28, 2009
Lt. Colonel Scott "Spike" Thomas	1	7–3	.700	November 7, 2009
Isiah Thomas	1	8–2	.800	October 31, 2026
Justin Thomas	1	5–7	.417	November 9, 2019
Thurman Thomas	1	8–3	.727	November 4, 2017
Matthew Tkachuk	1	6–3	.667	September 20, 2025
LaDainian Tomlinson	1	7–2	.778	December 3, 2022
Twenty One Pilots	1	7–3	.700	November 20, 2021
Gabrielle Union	1	7–6	.538	September 28, 2019
Dwyane Wade	1	4–5	.444	September 28, 2019
Bill Walton	1	5–6	.455	October 23, 2021
Bubba Watson	1	10–0	1.000	September 28, 2013
Lil Wayne	1	7–3	.700	November 5, 2016
Jon Weiner	1	6–5	.545	September 26, 2020
Christian Wilkins	1	9–2	.818	October 1, 2022
Brian Wilson	1	4–5	.444	November 5, 2011
Lainey Wilson	1	5–0	1.000	September 5, 2026
Gene Wojciechowski	1	4–6	.400	October 14, 2017
Bryce Young	1	5–6	.455	October 10, 2026
Steve Young	1	10–0	1.000	October 17, 2026

== History ==
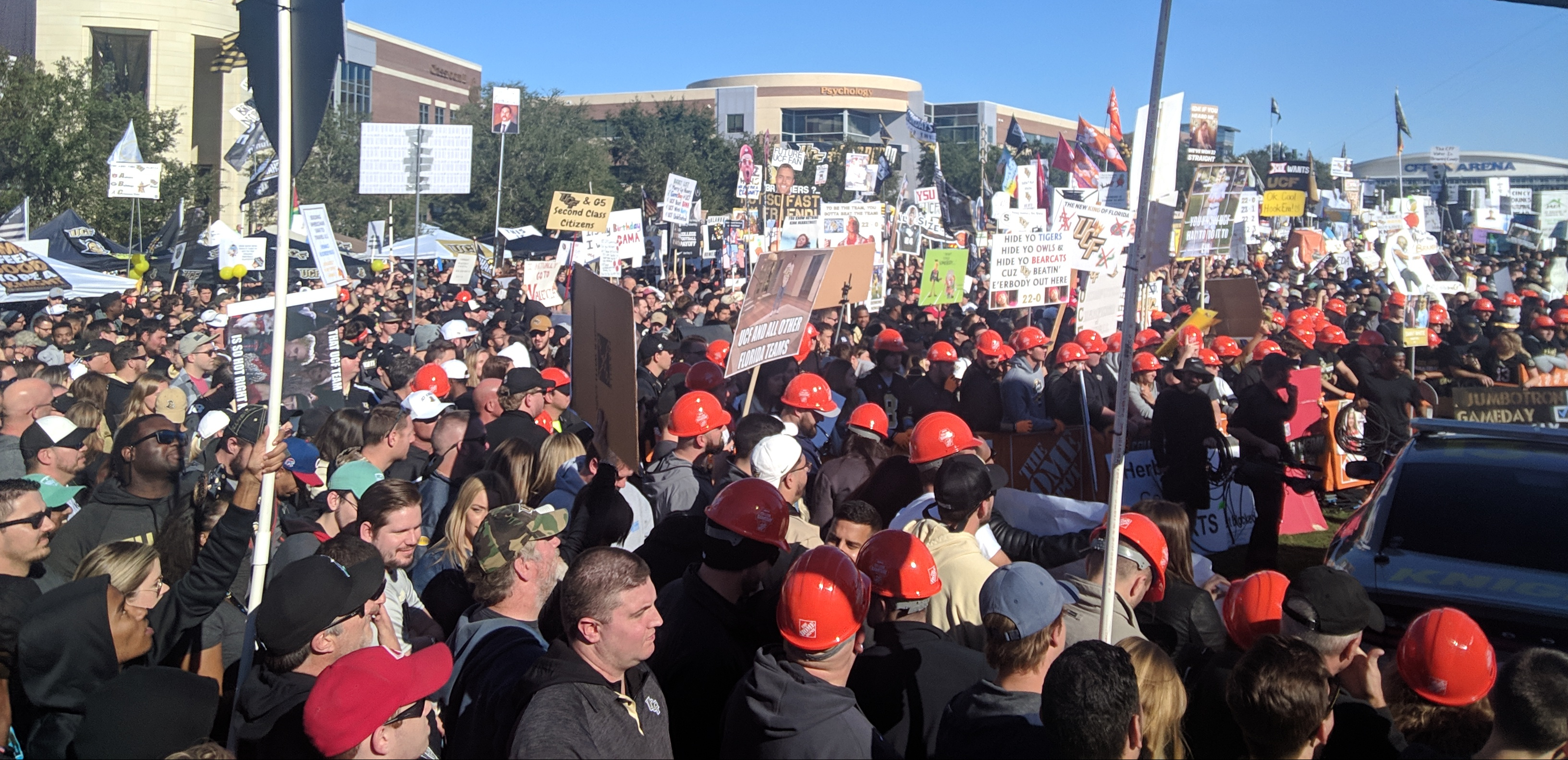
Fan-made signs and flags being held up behind the set help make up the atmosphere of GameDay, as seen here at UCF in November 2018.

GameDay started on ESPN in 1987 and was originally broadcast from a studio in Connecticut.

In 1993, GameDay took the show "on the road" for the first time, going to South Bend, Indiana for the match-up between #2 Notre Dame and #1 FSU on November 13. (Matchups between the top two teams were rare prior to the BCS). It broadcast from the Sports Heritage Hall at the Notre Dame Joyce Center. The broadcast was such a success that they did nearly half their shows in 1994 on the road and in 1995 abandoned the studio altogether.

The format also changed from broadcasting from an indoor studio on site to live from outside a stadium hosting a big game most Saturdays. The selected stadium is usually hosting one of the biggest matchups of the day, regardless of whether the game airs on an ESPN network.

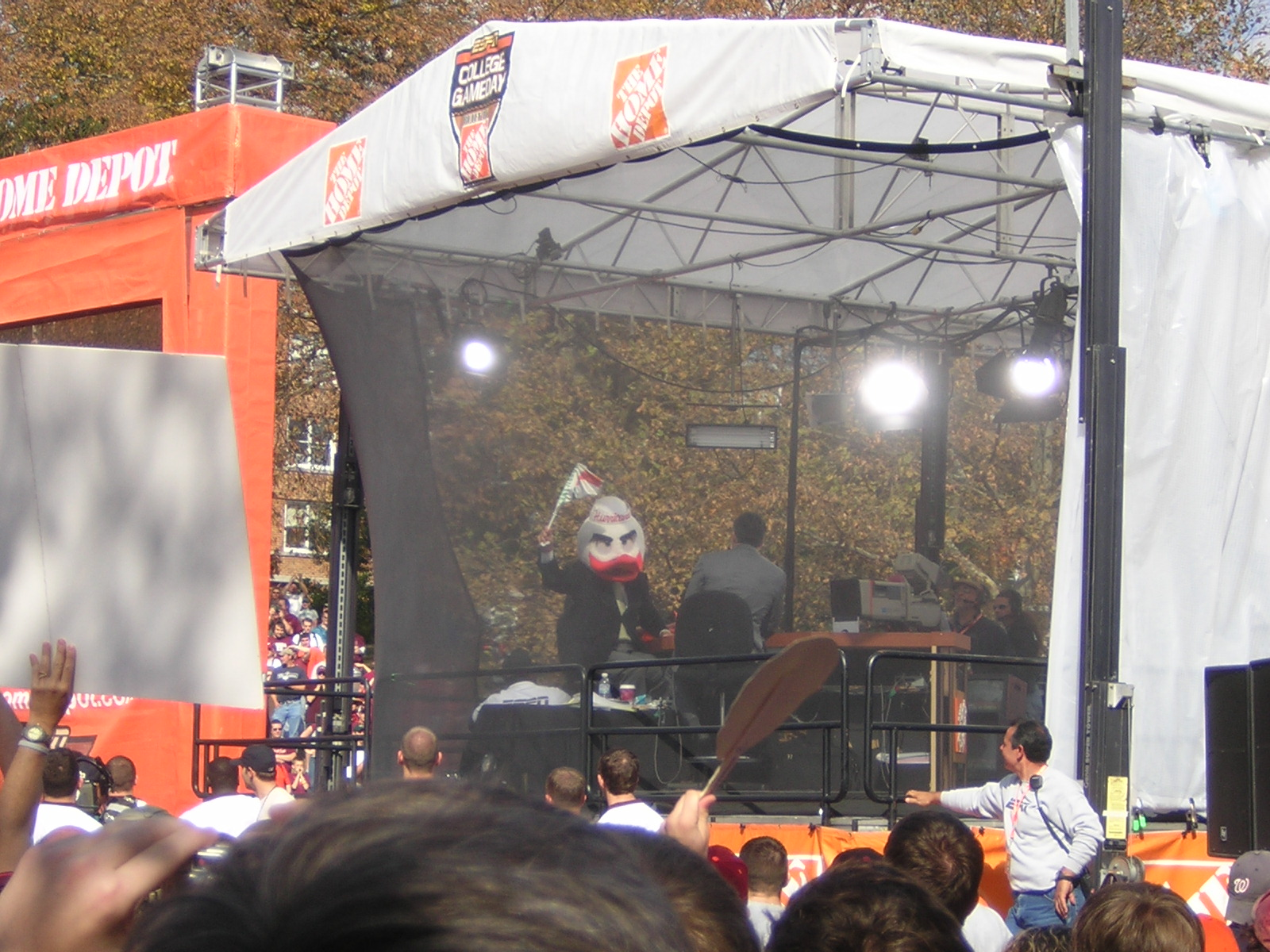
At Virginia Tech in November 2005, Corso picks the University of Miami to upset Virginia Tech. Note the head of Sebastian the Ibis, the University of Miami's mascot.

Typically, the show will end with Lee Corso and Kirk Herbstreit issuing their predictions for that day's key matchups, finishing with the game to be played at the stadium hosting GameDay, for which Corso signifies his prediction by donning the head piece of the mascot of his predicted winner. Starting with the 2009 season, a celebrity guest picker gives picks for the day's key games alongside the GameDay regulars (such as Bob Knight when GameDay aired from Texas Tech in 2008, NASCAR star Dale Earnhardt Jr. when GameDay aired from Bristol Motor Speedway (a NASCAR track) in 2016 and Verne Lundquist in Tuscaloosa, Alabama, since it was his final season calling college football games on CBS). Prior to 2009, this was not done on a regular basis. Herbstreit, who in 2006 became a game analyst for ABC's Saturday Night Football, is not allowed to make a pick for the game at which he is assigned due to parent company Disney's conflict-of-interest rules; however, he is allowed to give one or two keys to the game.

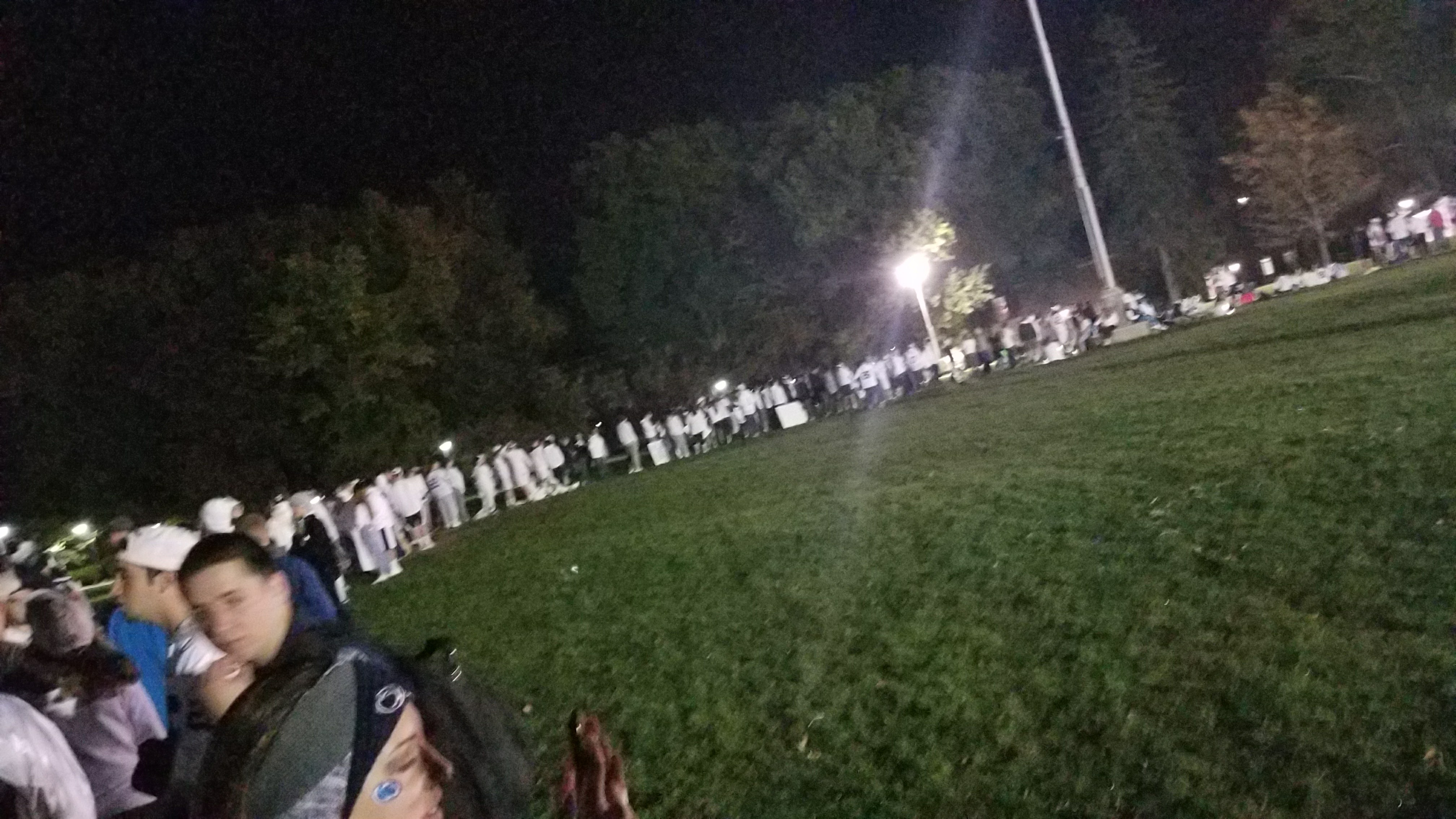
At Penn State in October 2017, several people were lined up for GameDay by 3 AM, 6 hours before the show began.

In past years, when no suitably important game was available, it would originate instead from the ESPN studios. In 2017, with no suitably important game available, one show aired from Times Square instead. In August 2019, College GameDay aired from parent company Disney's Magic Kingdom Park in Disney World ahead of the University of Florida-Miami game played in Orlando.

College GameDay was also a source for many arguments regarding the purported east coast bias: From 1993 until 2004, GameDay had only been to two regular season games on the entire West Coast (1998 at UCLA and 2000 at Oregon). Given the popularity of the show and the media coverage it brought to the highlighted game, teams and fans of the West Coast teams felt that the show was only magnifying the perceived problems with excess media focus on East, South and Midwest games; ESPN attributed its lack of West Coast games to the need for a very early start time (07:00 AM PST) and an alleged lack of high quality matchups.

With the addition of the Saturday Night Football game on ABC in 2006, GameDay has increasingly aired from that game. This could be done for many reasons including the fact Kirk Herbstreit is on both programs, thus making it easier for him. Another reason could be to give the Saturday Night Football game added exposure.

Beginning with the show's 21st season (2007), College GameDay began broadcasting in high-definition on ESPN HD. Also the same season, California became the first (and as of 2024, only) team to decline to host College GameDay, as the school believed GameDay should go to Virginia Tech after the Virginia Tech shooting earlier in the year. 17 years later, California would finally make its debut hosting College GameDay for a 2024 matchup against Miami.

College GameDay expanded to 3 hours, with the first hour being televised on ESPNU, beginning September 4, 2010. In addition, ESPN Radio simulcasts the television version from 9am-noon ET. Other changes include the addition of a female contributor—first Erin Andrews in 2010 and 2011, and then Samantha Ponder (then known by her maiden name, Samantha Steele) after Andrews left ESPN for Fox following the 2011 season. Both Andrews and Ponder have anchored several segments during the first hour on ESPNU, contributed during the ESPN portion, and also worked as a sideline reporter on the game from which College GameDay originated, if it aired on one of the ESPN family of networks (i.e. ESPN, ESPN2, ESPNU, ABC).

Beginning with the 2013 season, the third hour moved to ESPN and was hosted by Fowler. Starting in 2014, the show began a now annual visit to the Army-Navy Game in mid-December. As of 2018, the entire show is simulcast on both ESPN and ESPNU.

As previously mentioned, beginning with the 29th season (2015), Rece Davis (who is also the host of the college basketball version) replaced Chris Fowler as the football version's new host. Fowler retained his play-by-play duties on ABC's Saturday Night Football.

In March 2018, ESPN announced that it would broadcast a special edition of College GameDay from Arlington, Texas, as a pre-show for its coverage of day 1 of the 2018 NFL draft. The broadcast accompanied a secondary telecast of the draft on ESPN2, which was hosted by the College GameDay panelists (barring Kirk Herbstreit, as he was involved in ESPN's main broadcast to replace the outgoing Jon Gruden).

In the 2020 season, College GameDay underwent modifications due to the COVID-19 pandemic. The program was broadcast without an audience, and with a modified desk to comply with social distancing rules. Corso did not travel with the remainder of the College GameDay panel due to health concerns, and instead made remote appearances from his home in Orlando, as well as in filmed sketches with appearances by team mascots.

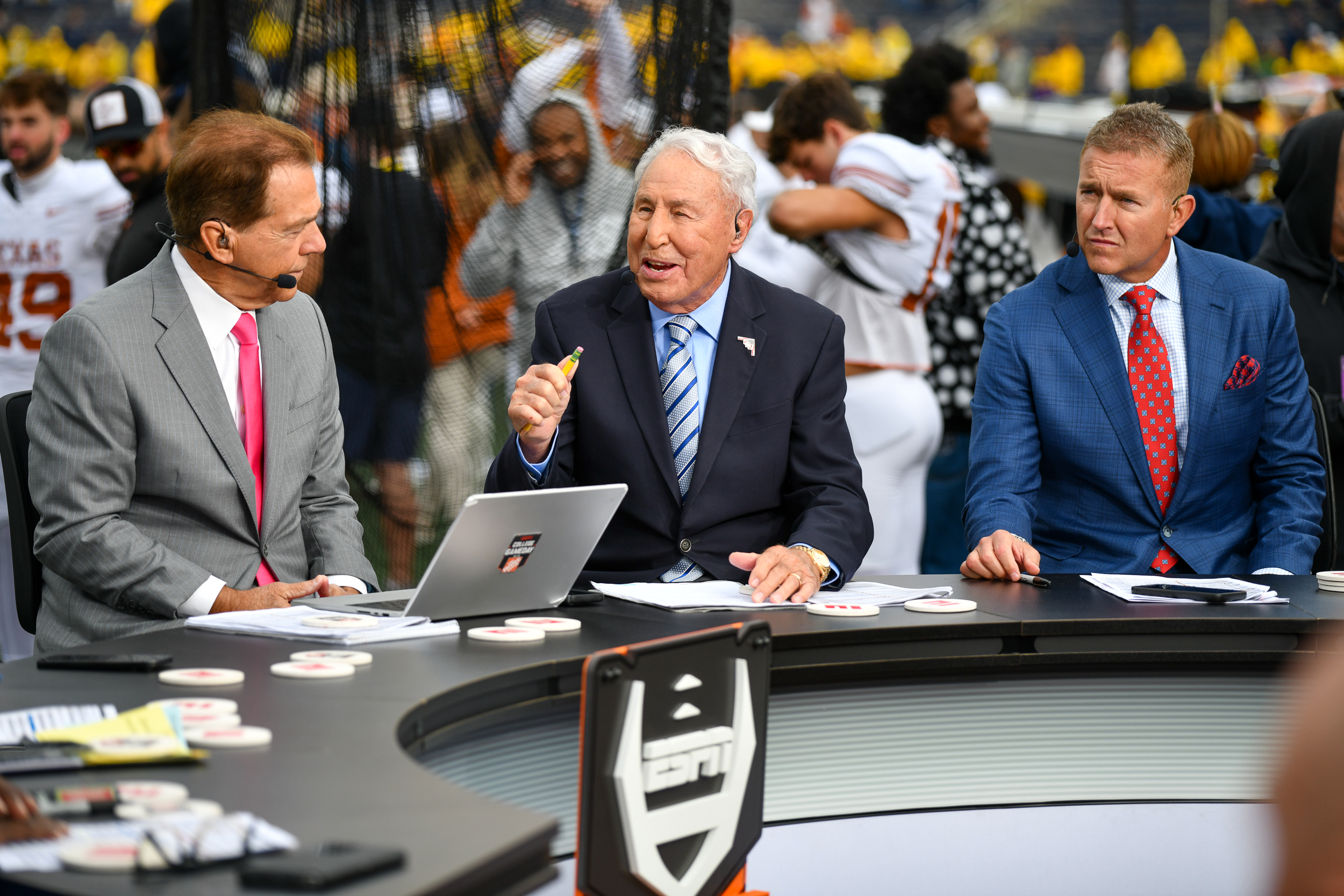
College GameDay at Michigan Stadium prior to a 2024 game.

By 2023, the crowds of students returned, and exceeded their pre-pandemic numbers. James Madison University holds the record for the largest GameDay crowd in its 30-year history.

On August 30, 2025, Corso retired from College GameDay, with the show broadcasting from Ohio State for its home opener against Texas. Corso conducted his headgear pick segment for the final time on the field of Ohio Stadium. With the game itself being televised by Fox, its competing pre-game show Big Noon Kickoff also carried the segment in tribute to Corso, as presented by the team's media department on Ohio Stadium's Jumbotron. The segment was retired afterward; the culmination of the show was replaced by Pat McAfee's selection, where he cuts a wrestling-style promo against the visiting team. The promo had been performed by McAfee in prior editions since joining the program, particularly when Corso was absent.

For a period in November 2025, amid a carriage dispute with ESPN and the streaming television service YouTube TV, ESPN streamed College GameDay for free via the ESPN app and on Pat McAfee's X profile.

=== Sports Emmy scandal ===
As of 2018, College GameDay has collected eight Sports Emmy Awards for Outstanding Studio Show, tied with TNT's Inside the NBA for the most wins by an analysis program. An incident happened in 2024 where ESPN admitted that for some of the Emmys it had won from 2010 to 2018, it had fraudulently received Sports Emmy Awards statuettes from the National Academy of Television Arts and Sciences (NATAS). Beginning in at least 2010 and possibly going back as far as 1997, ESPN had listed fake names in the credit list for its College GameDay program. These names were similar to the names of actual ESPN employees who were ineligible to receive the awards—for example, "Lee Clark" and "Kirk Henry" were listed as "associate producers" on the show, which has Lee Corso and Kirk Herbstreit as on-air personalities. After receiving the statuettes, ESPN would then have them re-engraved with the actual names of the individuals and presented to them.

Following the discovery of the scandal, NATAS requested that ESPN return several awards that had been obtained in this manner. By January 2024, ESPN had returned 37 improperly-won statuettes to the academy. Per Sports Illustrated, these 37 awards were all received by College GameDay.

== Locations ==
=== Appearances by school ===
Appearances through November 28, 2026.

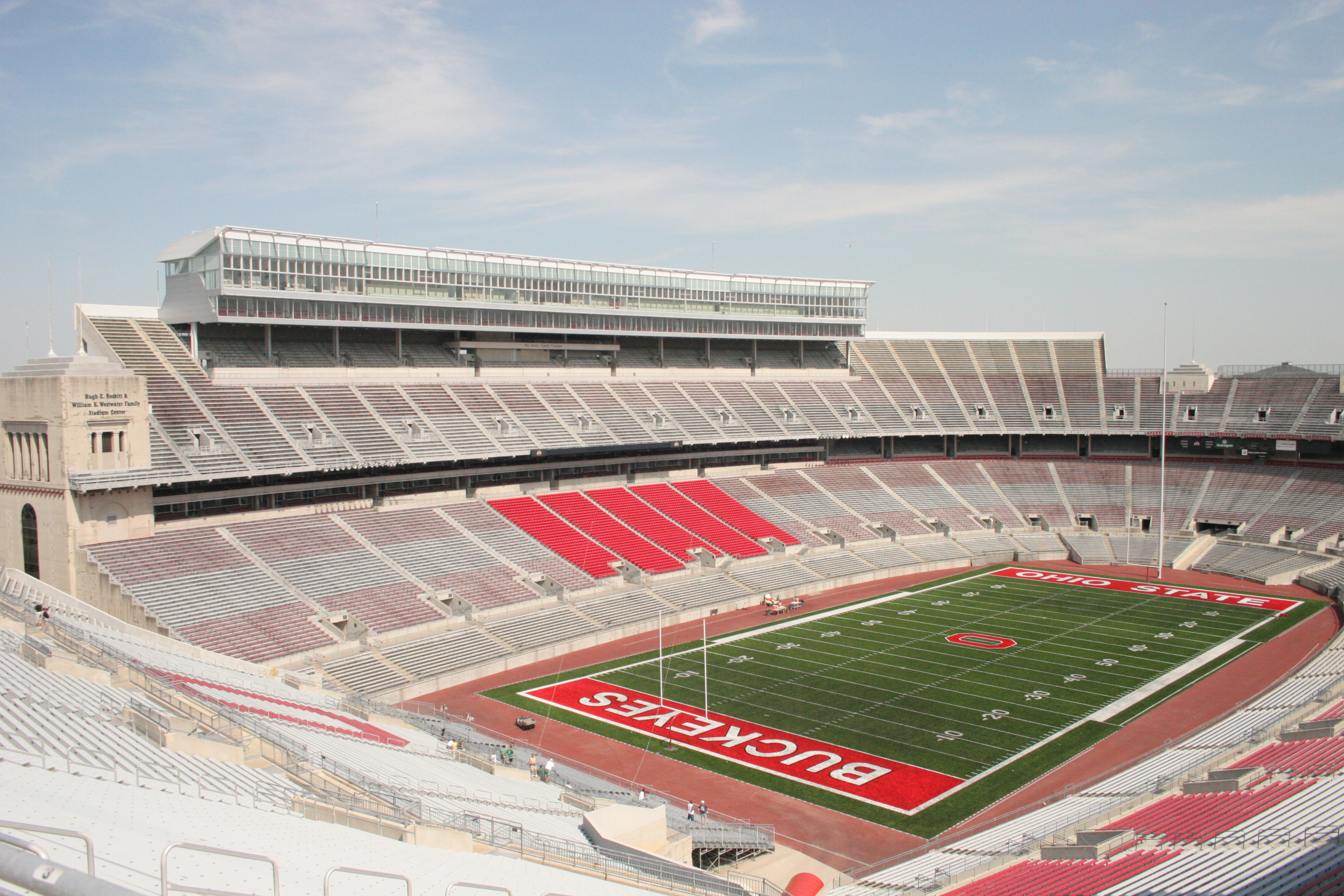
Ohio State has appeared in and hosted GameDay more than any other school, with 71 and 26 times respectively.

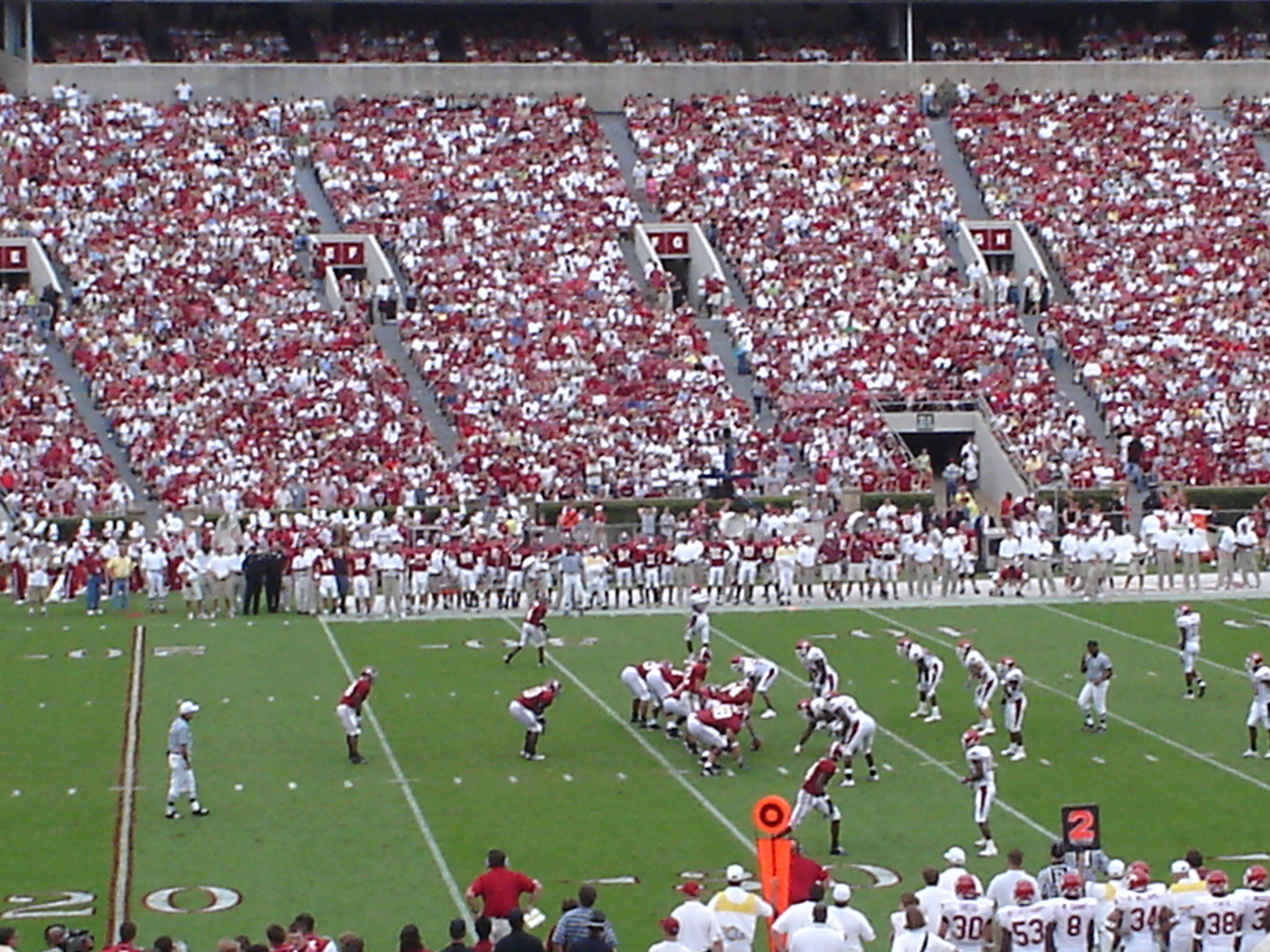
Alabama has hosted GameDay on campus 21 times and has made a total of 65 appearances on GameDay, making them second in total appearances. The first three appearances were off-campus from Legion Field in Birmingham.

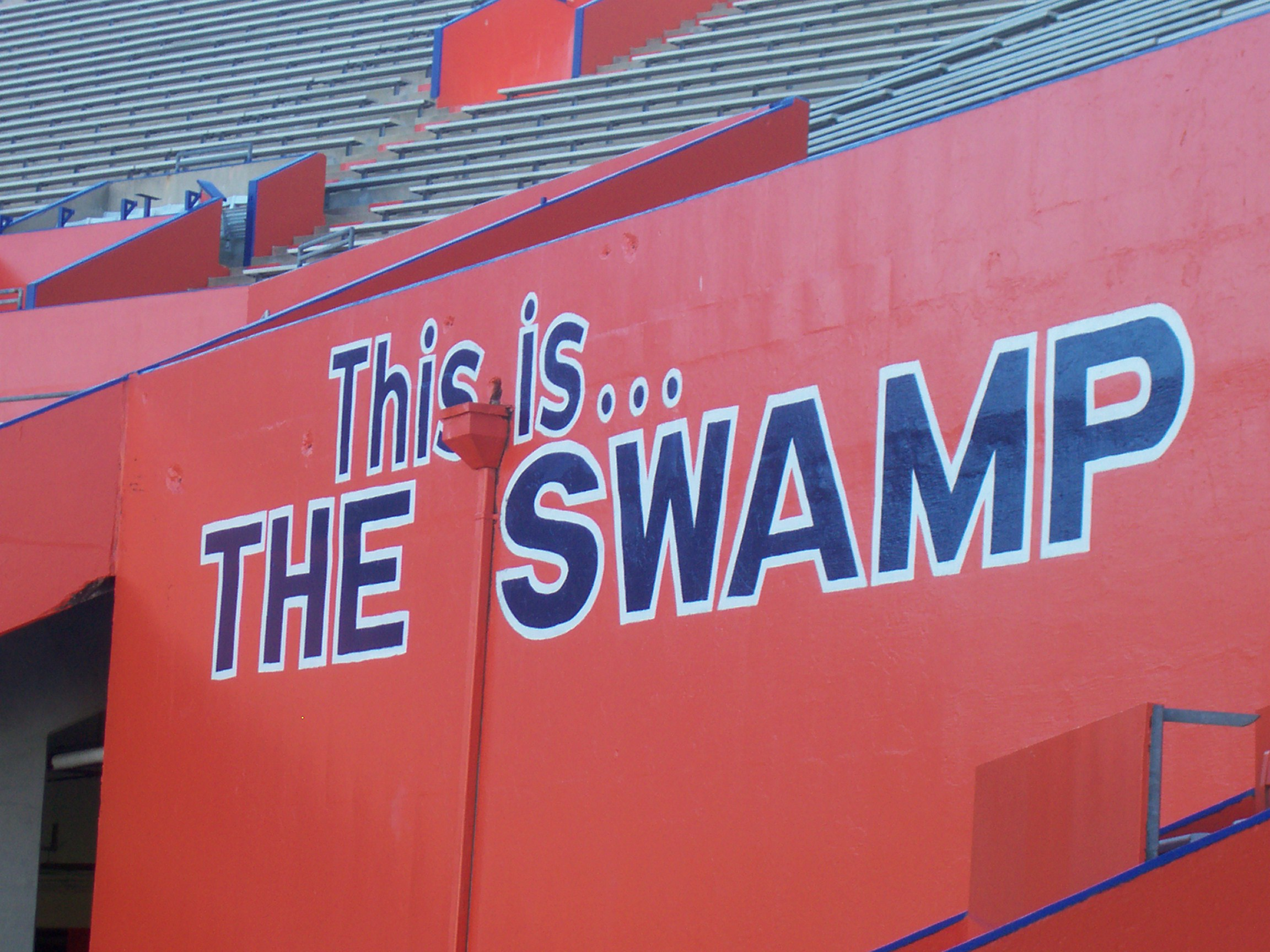
The Florida Gators have been featured on GameDay 43 times, which makes them tied for fourth in most total appearances.

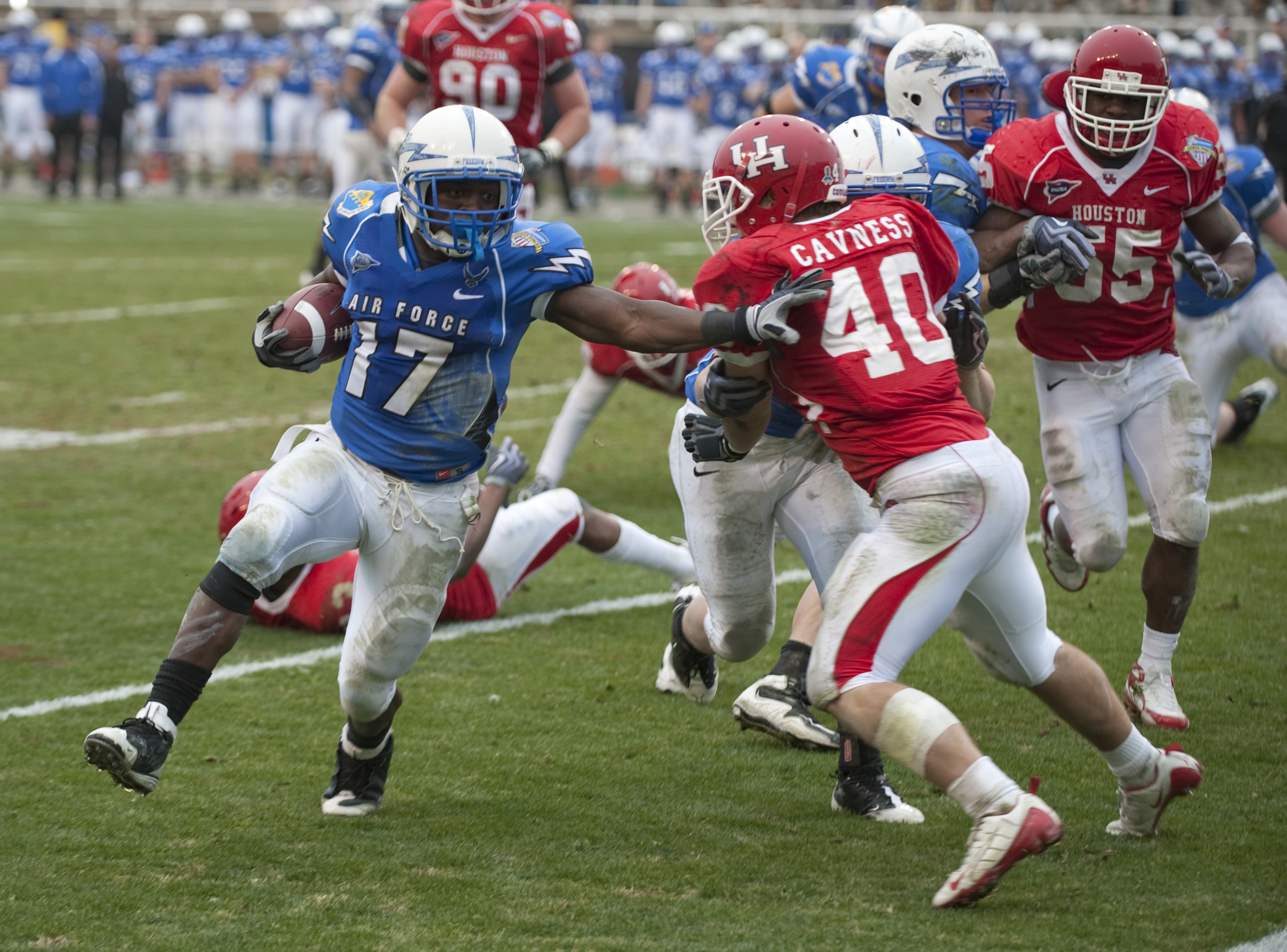
Air Force is one of only two "Group of Five" schools to have hosted GameDay three times.

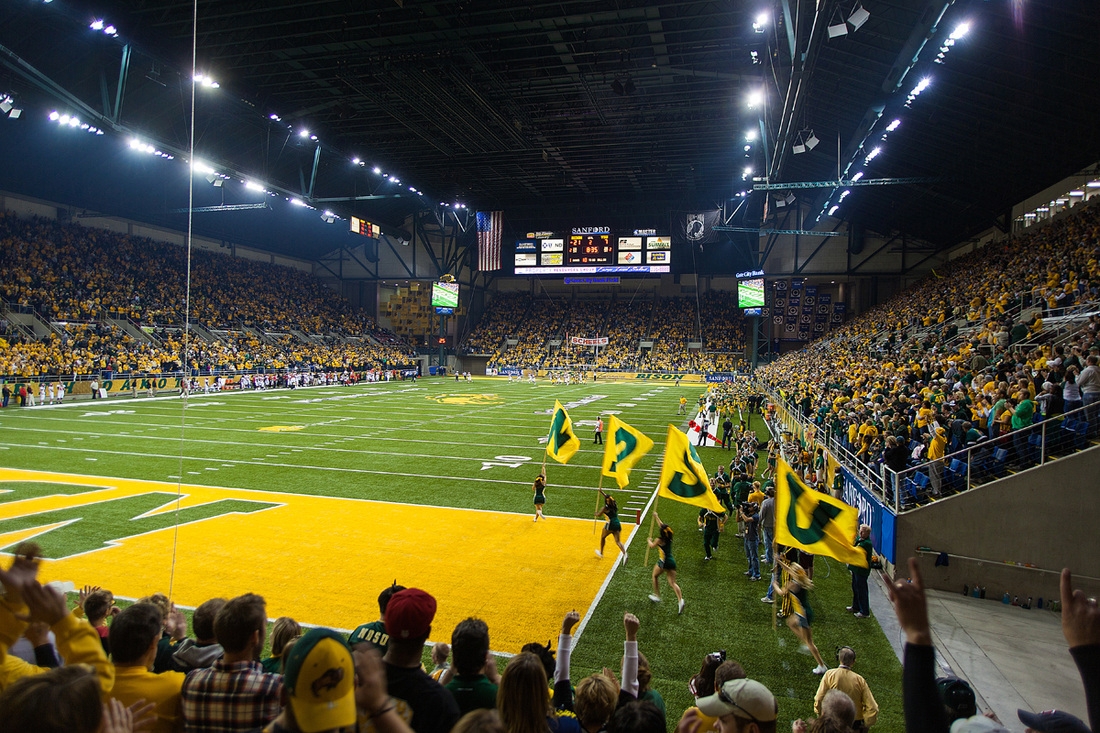
North Dakota State is the only FCS program to host GameDay twice.

A Washington State Cougars flag has flown at every GameDay broadcast since 2003, but GameDay did not visit Martin Stadium (pictured) until 2018.

With the completion of the 2014 season, the SEC became the first (and, until 2022, the only) conference to have all of its members host GameDay at least once (although Missouri has never hosted while an SEC member; they hosted as a member of the Big 12). The SEC has also hosted GameDay more than any other conference.

School	Appearances	Hosted	Record	Win %	Last hosted
Ohio State	71	26	49–22	.690	August 30, 2025
Alabama	65	21	41–24	.631	October 10, 2026
Georgia	44	11	24–20	.545	October 18, 2025
Florida	43	13	26–17	.605	October 5, 2019
Notre Dame	43	13	21–22	.488	November 7, 2026
Oklahoma	43	11	28–15	.651	December 19, 2025
Michigan	42	16	21–21	.500	November 29, 2025
LSU	38	15	23–15	.605	September 5, 2026
Florida State	36	11	17–19	.472	October 18, 2014
Oregon	36	14	21–15	.583	November 22, 2025
Clemson	31	9	19–12	.613	October 1, 2022
Miami (FL)	31	10	20–11	.645	November 21, 2026
Texas	30	11	15–15	.500	September 12, 2026
Tennessee	29	13	12–17	.414	September 26, 2026
Penn State	28	11	10–18	.357	September 27, 2025
USC	25	10	18–7	.720	November 16, 2013
Auburn	23	9	10–13	.435	November 25, 2017
Wisconsin	20	8	7–13	.350	November 18, 2017
Nebraska	17	7	9–8	.529	September 28, 2019
Michigan State	16	8	9–7	.563	October 30, 2021
Virginia Tech	15	6	4–11	.267	September 30, 2017
Army	12	2	5–7	.417	December 12, 2020
Texas A&M	12	9	1–11	.083	December 20, 2025
Stanford	11	1	6–5	.545	November 12, 2011
TCU	11	3	8–3	.727	September 15, 2018
Iowa	10	3	3–7	.300	October 3, 2026
Navy	10	0	4–6	.400	N/A
South Carolina	10	8	3–7	.300	September 14, 2024
UCLA	10	2	3–7	.300	October 23, 2021
Utah	10	7	4–6	.400	October 24, 2026
Washington	10	3	2–8	.200	October 14, 2023
Indiana	9	3	6–3	.667	October 31, 2026
Oklahoma State	9	6	1–8	.111	November 4, 2017
Ole Miss	8	3	4–4	.500	September 19, 2026
Colorado	7	4	3–4	.429	September 16, 2023
Kansas State	7	2	2–5	.286	October 14, 2000
Missouri	7	1	3–4	.429	October 23, 2010
Georgia Tech	6	2	1–5	.167	September 2, 2006
BYU	5	2	1–4	.200	October 17, 2026
Louisville	5	3	2–3	.400	September 19, 2020
Texas Tech	5	2	2–3	.400	November 8, 2025
West Virginia	5	2	1–4	.200	November 1, 2014
Baylor	4	3	1–3	.250	November 16, 2019
California	4	1	1–3	.250	October 5, 2024
Oregon State	4	1	0–4	.000	December 4, 2010
Pittsburgh	4	4	2–2	.500	November 15, 2025
Air Force	3	3	2–1	.667	November 7, 2009
Arizona	3	2	0–3	.000	September 26, 2015
Arizona State	3	1	0–3	.000	October 1, 2005
Arkansas	3	1	1–2	.333	November 11, 2006
Boston College	3	3	1–2	.333	November 10, 2018
Cincinnati	3	1	1–2	.333	November 6, 2021
James Madison	3	3	1–2	.333	November 18, 2023
Minnesota	3	2	0–3	.000	October 24, 2020
North Carolina	3	1	1–2	.333	November 8, 1997
North Dakota State	3	2	3–0	1.000	September 13, 2014
Northwestern	3	2	1–2	.333	October 5, 2013
Purdue	3	1	1–2	.333	October 16, 2004
Vanderbilt	3	2	2–1	.667	October 25, 2025
Washington State	3	1	1–2	.333	October 20, 2018
Appalachian State	2	1	2–0	1.000	September 17, 2022
Boise State	2	2	2–0	1.000	November 14, 2026
Duke	2	1	0–1	.000	September 30, 2023
Harvard	2	1	1–1	.500	November 22, 2014
Houston	2	1	1–1	.500	November 19, 2011
Illinois	2	0	1–1	.500	N/A
Iowa State	2	2	0–2	.000	September 11, 2021
Kansas	2	1	0–2	.000	October 8, 2022
Kentucky	2	1	0–2	.000	October 20, 2007
Mississippi State	2	1	1–1	.500	October 11, 2014
NC State	2	1	0–2	.000	October 23, 2004
SMU	2	0	0–2	.000	N/A
Southern	2	0	0–2	.000	N/A
Syracuse	2	0	0–2	.000	N/A
Troy	2	0	1–1	.500	N/A
UCF	2	1	1–1	.500	November 17, 2018
Wake Forest	2	2	0–1	.000	November 28, 2026
Bowling Green	1	1	1–0	1.000	October 25, 2003
Coastal Carolina	1	1	1–0	1.000	December 5, 2020
Florida A&M	1	1	1–0	1.000	November 15, 2008
Jackson State	1	1	1–0	1.000	October 29, 2022
Memphis	1	1	1–0	1.000	November 2, 2019
Montana State	1	1	1–0	1.000	November 19, 2022
Penn	1	1	1–0	1.000	November 16, 2002
South Dakota State	1	1	0–1	.000	October 26, 2019
Temple	1	1	0–1	.000	October 31, 2015
Western Michigan	1	1	1–0	1.000	November 19, 2016
Williams	1	1	1–0	1.000	November 10, 2007
Alcorn State	1	0	0–1	.000	N/A
Amherst	1	0	0–1	.000	N/A
Buffalo	1	0	0–1	.000	N/A
Colorado State	1	0	0–1	.000	N/A
Delaware State	1	0	0–1	.000	N/A
East Carolina	1	0	0–1	.000	N/A
Grambling State	1	0	1–0	1.000	N/A
Hampton	1	0	0–1	.000	N/A
Incarnate Word	1	0	0–1	.000	N/A
Montana	1	0	0–1	.000	N/A
North Carolina Central	1	0	1–0	1.000	N/A
Northern Illinois	1	0	0–1	.000	N/A
Richmond	1	0	1–0	1.000	N/A
South Florida	1	0	1–0	1.000	N/A
Tulsa	1	0	0–1	.000	N/A
Villanova	1	0	0–1	.000	N/A
Yale	1	0	0–1	.000	N/A

=== Frequent matchups ===
College GameDay matchups with at least five games played.

Matchup	Apps.	Record	Last appearance	Last result
Alabama–Georgia	13	Alabama leads 8–5	October 10, 2026	Georgia 20–17
Alabama–LSU	13	Alabama leads 10–3	November 9, 2024	Alabama 42–13
Ohio State–Penn State	13	Ohio State leads 11–2	November 2, 2024	Ohio State 20–13
Michigan–Ohio State	10	Ohio State leads 6–4	November 29, 2025	Ohio State 27–9
Army–Navy	9	Army leads 5–4	December 9, 2023	Army 17–11
Florida–Tennessee	9	Florida leads 6–3	September 24, 2022	Tennessee 38–33
Oklahoma–Texas	8	Oklahoma leads 5–3	October 7, 2023	Oklahoma 34–30
Alabama–Auburn	8	Alabama leads 5–3	November 28, 2020	Alabama 42–13
Florida State–Miami	8	Miami leads 5–3	September 26, 2020	Miami 52–10
Florida–Florida State	8	Tied 4–4	November 28, 2009	Florida 37–10
Oklahoma–Oklahoma State	7	Oklahoma leads 7–0	November 21, 2020	Oklahoma 41–13
Michigan–Notre Dame	7	Michigan leads 5–2	September 1, 2018	Notre Dame 24–17
Georgia–Tennessee	5	Georgia leads 3–2	September 13, 2025	Georgia 44–41^{OT}
Oregon–UCLA	5	Oregon leads 4–1	October 22, 2022	Oregon 45–30
Michigan State–Ohio State	5	Ohio State leads 3–2	November 20, 2021	Ohio State 56–7
Georgia–LSU	5	LSU leads 4–1	December 7, 2019	LSU 37–10
Florida–LSU	5	LSU leads 3–2	October 12, 2019	LSU 42–28
Notre Dame–USC	5	USC leads 3–2	November 24, 2012	Notre Dame 22–13

== International broadcasts ==
In the UK, College GameDay was shown in full during BT Sport's decade on air (2013–2023), unless live sport was being aired on all of its channels. In July 2023, BT Sport was relaunched as TNT Sports following the sale of BT Sport to Warner Bros. Discovery EMEA. This saw the cessation of ESPN programming, and College GameDay stopped being shown in the UK. The program returned to UK screens on 18 November 2023 following an agreement between Sky Sports and ESPN which saw Sky Sports broadcasting College GameDay and three Saturday College Football games each week for the 2023 and 2024 seasons plus the Bowl games and the College Football Playoff.

In August 2025, streaming service DAZN secured a deal with ESPN which includes the broadcasting of College GameDay in the UK, Continental Europe, and MENA (Middle East and North Africa) regions, where there is no conflict, which resulted in the program also airing in the Asia-Pacific via this service. The broadcasts, since 2026, are also simulcast on Disney+ as well as a result of its global expansion and integration.

College GameDay is broadcast fully in Australia and New Zealand from 11 p.m. to 2 a.m. AEST on Sunday mornings, before carrying at least three college football games across the ESPN Australia networks through Foxtel or Fetch TV and streaming service Kayo Sports on Sunday mornings.

== See also ==
- College GameDay (basketball) (2005–present)
- ESPN Radio College GameDay (2000–present)
- SEC Nation (2014–present)
- Big Noon Kickoff (2019–present)
