= Ol' Crimson =

Washington State Cougars flag flown at College GameDay

Ol' Crimson is a Washington State Cougars flag flown in the background of College GameDay, a weekly college football TV program set on different college campuses across the nation. First flown by Tom Pounds in the crowd behind College GameDay's coverage of a 2003 season matchup in Austin, Texas, Ol' Crimson has become well-known for its longevity as a tradition, with the flag having been seen on 320 College GameDay broadcasts as of the end of the 2024 college football season. The tradition is coordinated by the Ol' Crimson Booster Club, which ships the flag to Washington State alumni who live near to where that week's episode of College GameDay will be broadcast. Multiple flags have been given the title of "Ol' Crimson", with all but the first two having been handmade by Tom Pounds.

== History ==
The first flag called "Ol' Crimson" was created by Tom Pounds' wife Syndie. Tom then drove to Austin, Texas to fly the flag in the background of College GameDay's broadcast ahead of a 2003 game between the Kansas State Wildcats and the Texas Longhorns, in an attempt to convince the program to visit a game at WSU's campus in Pullman, Washington. Since that broadcast, a Washington State flag has appeared on every College GameDay show, including broadcasts from the Magic Kingdom, a United States Navy ship, Times Square in New York City, Augusta National Golf Club, and College GameDay's first appearance in Pullman.
