= Ivan Maisel =

American sportswriter

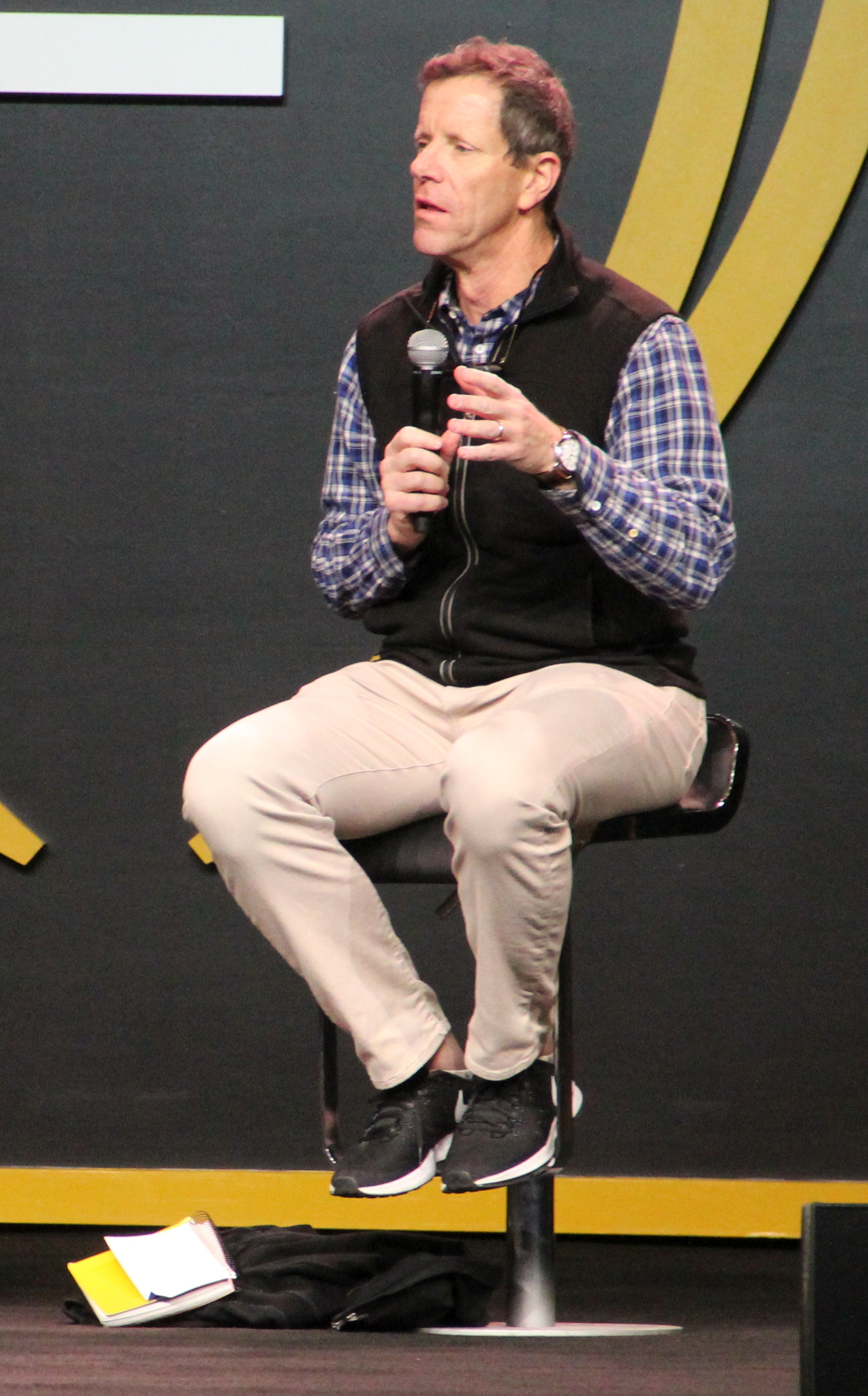
- Born: Mobile, Alabama, U.S.
- Occupation: College football writer
- Employer: On3.com

Ivan Maisel is an American national college football writer.

== Career ==
An alumnus of Murphy High in Mobile and Stanford University, Maisel began his career at The Atlanta Constitution in 1981, where he covered Clemson's unlikely run to the national championship. Sports Illustrated hired him as a reporter (fact-checker) the following year. He began covering national college football in 1987 for the Dallas Morning News, then moved to Newsday in 1994. He rejoined Sports Illustrated in 1997 as a senior writer. In 2002, ESPN.com hired him as its first college football writer. Maisel appeared on ESPN television, radio and podcasts. For many years he co-hosted the ESPN college football podcast. His regular guests included ESPN analyst Beano Cook (until Cook's death in October 2012), Gene Wojciechowski, and other ESPN colleagues.

Maisel served as the Editor-at-Large of ESPN College Football 150, the multi-platform project commemorating the 2019 sesquicentennial of the sport. In that role, Maisel served as the writer and host of Down & Distance, a podcast series, as a producer of The American Game and The Greatest, two 11-week series, and as a producer of Saturdays in the South, an eight-week series on the SEC Network.

Maisel has been honored nine times for Best Story by the Football Writers Association of America, most recently for a 2022 remembrance of the late football coach Mike Leach. The FWAA honored Maisel in 2016 with the Bert McGrane Award, the organization’s Hall of Fame. He has been honored twice by the Associated Press Sports Editors, who in 2019 named him one of the 10 best sports columnists in the nation. In 2020, the College Sports Information Directors of America presented Maisel the Jake Wade Award for his contribution to intercollegiate athletics. Maisel also won the Edwin Pope Vanguard Media Award from the Orange Bowl in 2019.

Maisel announced on Twitter in November 2020 that ESPN had informed him it would not renew his contract. He left the company in January 2021. On June 1, Maisel announced that he had been hired by On3 Media for its new website. On3.com began operating on August 1, 2021. Maisel worked for On3 until June 2023, when he announced his departure. He published a biography of former Notre Dame head coach Frank Leahy, "American Coach," in 2025.

== Personal life ==
Maisel was born to a Jewish family in Mobile, Alabama, the son of Freida Gutlow Maisel and real estate developer Herman Maisel. He has one brother, Elliot Maisel, and one sister, Kathy Bronstein. Ivan Maisel has often joked about his odd background, being a Jewish Alabamian.

Maisel's son, Max, went missing and was last seen on Sunday, February 22, 2015, leaving his apartment complex in Rochester, NY. On Friday, April 18, 2015, a body matching Max Maisel's description was found in Lake Ontario. On April 21, 2015, Max's body was positively identified. Max was a junior professional photographic illustration student at RIT. Maisel would later say "circumstantial evidence" pointed to suicide as the cause of Max's death. In September 2018, Maisel authored a story about the death of Tyler Hilinski, a Washington State quarterback who died by suicide, and Maisel's bond with the Hilinski family. In October 2021, Maisel published a memoir about his relationship with Max, titled I Keep Trying to Catch His Eye.
