= Jessica Sims =

Sports reporter and fitness instructor

- Born: August 5, 1988 (age 38); Peabody, Massachusetts, U.S.
- Occupations: Fitness coach, instructor
- Website: jesssims.com

Jessica "Jess" Sims (born 1988) is an American fitness instructor and sports reporter from Peabody, Massachusetts, USA.

== Early life ==
Sims was born in Peabody to JoAnn and Rick Sims. She played basketball in high school where she was a two-time all-star and four-time league champion. She was also a member of AAU basketball teams from the age of twelve. She played Division III basketball at Trinity College where she was the captain for three years and earned NESCAC All-Academic honors She graduated college in 2010 with majors in Hispanic Studies and Psychology.

== Career ==
Sims began her career as a teacher. She worked in Houston for Teach for America while obtaining her Master's Degree, and then as a kindergarten teacher in New York. For two years she worked as the operations director for a school in Harlem. She then became an assistant principal in Lynn, Massachusetts, where she focused on a health and wellness program.

In June 2016, Sims received her personal training certification and began teaching at boutique fitness studios in New York City. In 2018, Sims joined Peloton Interactive as a fitness instructor, teaching strength, running, and boot camp classes.

Sims has been an in-arena host and reporter for the New York Liberty since 2021.

In 2022, Sims joined the ESPN College Gameday Program. In December 2023, it was announced that Sims would join ESPN Saturday Primetime games' coverage of men’s college basketball as a sideline reporter for the 2023-2024 season.

In 2023, Sims joined the Good Morning America team as an ongoing contributor.
