= Chris Dufresne =

American sports journalist (1958–2020)

Christopher John Dufresne (April 11, 1958 – May 25, 2020) was an American sports journalist who was the Los Angeles Times national college football and basketball columnist from 1995 to 2015. He won multiple awards and was the 2011 California Sportswriter of the Year by the National Sportscasters and Sportswriters Association.

== Biography ==
Chris was born in Fullerton, California, and grew up in La Habra. He graduated from California State University, Fullerton in 1981 with a degree in journalism. In 1976, after high school, Dufresne got a job at the Los Angeles Times, where his father worked in the transportation department for 37 years. Dufresne started in the loading docks, then became a clerk covering prep sports at the Los Angeles Times Orange County bureau in 1981. He covered college football for The Times until 2015, when he accepted a buyout.

Dufresne continued to write and in 2016 found a new home for his alter ego, Rankman. He and three other award-winning sports writers, Tony Barnhart, Mark Blaudschun and Herb Gould co-founded TMGcollegesports.com, a national college football and basketball website.

On Monday evening, May 25, 2020, the 62 year-old Dufresne died of unknown causes but was awaiting results of a possible recurrence of melanoma.
