= Beano Cook =

American journalist (1931–2012)

- Born: Carroll Hoff Cook; September 1, 1931; Boston, Massachusetts, U.S.
- Died: October 11, 2012 (aged 81); Green Tree, Pennsylvania, U.S.
- Education: The Kiski School; University of Pittsburgh (BA)
- Occupation: College football commentator
- Years active: 1986–2012
- Employer: ESPN

Carroll Hoff "Beano" Cook (September 1, 1931 – October 11, 2012) was an American television personality who worked for ESPN. He was a college football historian and commentator. He received his B.A. from the University of Pittsburgh in 1954.

== Biography ==
Cook received his unusual nickname at the age of seven from a neighbor in Pittsburgh, as a reference to his recent move from Boston (nicknamed Beantown).

Cook graduated from the University of Pittsburgh in 1954, then served for two years in the U.S. Army. He was a sports publicist for the University of Pittsburgh from 1956 to March 1966, worked for the Miami Dolphins for one season, served as a publicist for both ABC and CBS in New York City, and spent time as a vice president with the Pittsburgh Civic Arena when it was run by Edward DeBartolo, Sr. In between those stints, Cook volunteered with VISTA in Florida in 1976.

Cook served as ABC's media director from 1966 to 1974, and was an in-studio commentator for ABC's college football scoreboard show from 1982 to 1985.

For a brief period in the late 1980s, Cook did commentary on WPXI-TV in Pittsburgh.

=== ESPN ===
Cook joined ESPN in 1986 as a studio commentator. He also did freelance radio and television work in the Pittsburgh area. Cook was seen on ESPNEWS every Thursday on The Hot List debating with Brian Kenny. Cook could be heard weekly on ESPN Radio during The Herd with Colin Cowherd and on Wednesdays was a special guest on ESPN Radio's I-Formation hosted by Ivan Maisel. Cook also appeared weekly on Pittsburgh's Fox Sports Radio 970 AM, WBGG-AM, weekly during football season at 8 a.m. PT on the Mitch in The Morning Show on Sports Radio 950 KJR AM in Seattle. He co-hosted the ESPNU College Football Podcast on ESPN.com and iTunes with Maisel. He was an occasional guest of Mark Madden on ESPN 1250 in Pittsburgh as well as ESPN Radio's AllNight with Jason Smith show.

Known for his frequent historical references and his affinity for college football played in the Upper Midwest and Rust Belt states, he possessed a quick wit and a penchant for telling humorous stories. After the Commissioner of Baseball Bowie Kuhn offered the returning hostages from the Iran hostage crisis lifetime passes to Major League Baseball games, Cook quipped, "Haven't they suffered enough?"

Cook was also often referred to as the "Pope of College Football" due to his knowledge and tenure with the game.

=== Blog ===
Beano Cook began a blog in 2010, covering topics other than college football.

=== Bert McGrane Award ===
It was announced on December 8, 2010, on ESPNU that Cook was the 2010 winner of the Bert McGrane Award.

== Death ==
Cook died in his sleep on the morning of October 11, 2012 at the age of 81. He was buried at Pittsburgh's Allegheny Cemetery.
