= FloSports =

Sports streaming website

- Available in: English
- Headquarters: Austin, Texas
- Key people: Mark Floreani, CEO; Jayar Donlan, COO
- Products: Streaming media; Video on demand; Streaming television
- Employees: 300
- Subsidiaries: MileSplit; DirtonDirt.com; TrackWrestling
- Website: flosports.tv
- Commercial: Yes
- Launched: 2006

FloSports is an over-the-top subscription sports broadcaster and streaming service. The company is based in Austin, Texas, United States, and was founded in 2006. FloSports streams live sporting events to audiences around the world.

== History ==
=== Launch ===
FloSports was founded in 2006 by Martin Floreani, Mark Floreani (collegiate athletes) and Madhu Venkatesan based in Austin, Texas. Martin designed the website's prototype with the aim of covering collegiate sports with the same detail that ESPN gives to the NFL and NBA. The brothers raised U.S. $10,000 in seed money from John Rainbolt and started covering wrestling and track events. Co-founder Mark captured the service's first original broadcast, Ryan Hall's U.S half-marathon record, from the back of a pickup truck using a handheld camera. Lo-fi footage, engine noise digital interference and fog impacted the quality of the broadcast. However, having the only footage of Hall's record-breaking run caused a surge in the website's popularity. By 2017 the company had 256 employees and 25 Web video channels. They changed their business model to a subscription-based service in 2012 and doubled their revenue over the following two years.

=== Fundraising ===
The company raised $8 million in Series A and a further $21 million in Series B financing in 2016 led by DCM Ventures and Bertelsmann Digital Media Investments. By 2019, the company had grown to 250 employees and raised a further $47 million in series C.

=== Acquisitions ===
The company acquired DirtonDirt.com, a grassroots racing streaming and content platform, in September 2019. In June 2020, FloSports purchased Speed Shift TV and acquired 400 races, with a focus on grassroots racing.

FloSports acquired TrackWrestling in early 2021, a deal that increased the number of wrestling events that will be streamed on its FloWrestling service and brought wrestling analytics to the platform. In October 2021, it was announced that FloSports had acquired HockeyTech, an ice hockey streaming platform and sports data provider.

=== Streaming partnerships ===
FloSports announced a partnership with WWNLive in 2016 to run a streaming service dedicated to professional wrestling. In December 2018, FloRacing signed a broadcast agreement with the United States Auto Club for its midget and sprint car series. In May 2019, the Colonial Athletic Association selected FloSports as its lead media partner becoming the first college conference to pick a streaming OTT, direct-to-consumer company as their primary distribution platform.

FloSports became the local broadcaster for two Major League Soccer teams for the 2019 season: D.C. United and FC Cincinnati, an expansion team. The company faced technical issues during early broadcasts due to inaccurate geofencing restrictions. The organization pledged a full refund, and offered the club's season ticket holders a discount on its annual subscription fees. FloSports promised additional soccer broadcasts and shoulder programming to justify its subscription fee that largely never materialized. D.C. United and Flosports ended their four-year contract prematurely in October 2019. D.C. United opted to stream its final regular season match on its website for free. FC Cincinnati announced its matches would no longer be available through FloSports in June 2020.

In January 2020, NASCAR Hall of Fame inductee and motorsports legend, Tony Stewart, awarded streaming rights to the Eldora Speedway and All Star Circuit of Champions to FloSports. In the Spring 2020, FloSports launched FloBaseball. Later in 2020, the company signed a multi-year partnership with ECHL to broadcast professional hockey starting with the 2021 season.

FloSports expanded its wrestling offering through a partnership with United World Wrestling, the global governing body for the sport, in late 2020.

In 2021, USA Cycling signed a 3 year broadcast partnership with FloSports. FloSports will also be the NGB's (national governing body's) official sponsor. The Unbound Gravel race, a cycling race covering various distances, has never been broadcast before due to remote locations and rough terrain. FloSports became the first to broadcast the race in June 2021 and will stream the race again in 2022. FloSports signed a multi-year streaming deal with USA Gymnastics, the national governing body for gymnastics, in 2021.

In late 2021, NASCAR announced a partnership to stream its grassroots racing series on FloRacing starting in 2022. Series that were broadcast on FloRacing that year included the ARCA Menards Series, ARCA Menards Series West, ARCA Menards Series East, NASCAR Whelen Modified Tour, and NASCAR Pinty's Series and NASCAR Weekly Series. Several tracks on the Modified and Weekly Series had been broadcasting on the service prior to the announcement (Eldora, Oswego, Stafford). Over 280 NASCAR grassroots events were anticipated to be broadcast in 2022 (out of a total of approximately 2000 total events broadcast on the service).

In March 2023, the IBJJF announced that the Campeonato Brasileiro de Jiu-Jitsu would be included in their offering of events streaming on FloGrappling from 2023 onwards. In July 2023, AIGA Champions League announced that all their future events would stream exclusively on FloGrappling. In September 2023, Quintet announced that all of their future events would be streaming on FloGrappling, starting with Quintet 4 on September 10, 2023.

=== Broadcasting deals ===
In early 2023, Brazilian channel Combate announced a broadcasting deal with FloGrappling starting on May 22, 2023 to show both their grappling content and original documentaries.

=== Technology ===
In 2019, the company introduced apps for Android and smart TV apps. In October 2019, FloSports rebranded, and expanded its distribution with the release of an Android app.

In 2020, FloSports began working on a Watch Party feature for their apps that would allow fans to watch events together, virtually.

== Programming ==
FloSports streams live and on-demand events for over 25 different sports categories.

=== Baseball ===
- Coastal Athletic Association
- College Baseball Classic
- Future Star Series Nationals 15s
- Future Star Series Nationals 16s
- Future Star Series Nationals 17s
- NB Future Stars Series

=== Basketball ===
- Basketball Bundesliga
- Coastal Athletic Association
- EuroCup
- EuroLeague, from the 2017-2018 Final Four playoffs through at least the 2019-2020 season.
- FIBA 3x3 World Tour

=== Bowling ===
- PBA
- PBA50
- PBA Senior
- USBC
- World Bowling Tour

=== Cycling ===
- Cycling Canada
- Giro d'Italia (Canada Only)
- Tour de France (Canada Only)
- Union Européenne De Cyclisme
- Union Cycliste Internationale

=== Football ===
- All American Classic
- Coastal Athletic Association
- FCS Bowl
- Dream Bowl
- HBCU Spirit of America Bowl
- Mid-Eastern Athletic Conference
- National Bowl
- South Atlantic Conference
- Southern Intercollegiate Athletic Conference
- Tropical Bowl

=== Grappling ===
- ADCC Submission Wrestling World Championship
- IBJJF

==== Who's Number One (WNO) ====
Who's Number One also known as FloGrappling WNO Championship is a grappling event series streamed on FloSports and organised since 2019 by its subdivision FloGrappling. It presents elite grapplers from around the world competing across different weight divisions and rule sets. The events encompass both gi and no-gi Brazilian jiu-jitsu matches.

=== Ice Hockey ===
- AHL
- Atlantic Hockey
- Big Ten
- CJHL
- ECHL
- OHL
- QMJHL
- SPHL
- USHL
- USPHL
- WCHA

=== Lacrosse ===
- Big Ten
- Frisco Classic
- Future Star Series
- Snowbird Baseball

=== Marching ===
- Drum Corps International
- Winter Guard International

=== Motorsports ===
- All Star Circuit of Champions
- Appalachian Mountain Speed Week
- ARCA Menards Series (Select Events with Fox Sports)
- ARCA Menards Series East and West
- CARS Tour
- Chili Bowl Nationals
- Eldora Speedway (Outside of World of Outlaws Events)
- FIA World Rallycross Championship
- High Limit Racing
- IRA Outlaw Sprints
- NARC King of the West 410 Sprints
- NASCAR Advance Auto Parts Weekly Series (Events held mostly at Bowman Gray Stadium, New Smyrna Speedway, and Berlin Raceway)
- Lucas Oil Late Model Dirt Series
- Marshalltown Speedway
- NASCAR Whelen Modified Tour
- Pennsylvania Speed Week
- Port City Speedway
- Port Royal Speedway
- Short Track Super Series
- Silver Dollar Speedway
- SMART Modified Tour
- South Boston Speedway
- Stafford Speedway
- Tulsa Speedway
- USAC including Sprint, Silver Crown, and Midget events such as Indiana Midget Week, Indiana Sprint Week, Pennsylvania Midget Week, Oval Nationals, and Turkey Night Grand Prix.
- Utica-Rome Speedway

=== Rodeo ===
- Canadian Finals Rodeo
- PBR
- RidePass

=== Rugby ===
- Autumn Nations Series
- England Rugby
- EPCR Challenge Cup
- European Rugby Champions Cup (EPCR)
- National Provisional Championship (New Zealand)
- PREM Rugby
- Rugby Sevens
- Super Rugby Pacific
- Top14
- United Rugby Championship
- USA Rugby

=== Softball ===
- Big Ten
- Candrea Classic
- Judi Garman Classic
- PGF
- Puerto Vallerta College Challenge
- Mark Campbell Collegiate Classic

=== Soccer ===
- CONCACAF (select matches)
- CNL League A
- CNL League B
- CNL League C
- Supercoppa Italiana and Coppa Italia (Canada only)
- NCAA

=== Swimming ===
- Big Ten
- Big 12
- ISCA
- LEN European Aquatics
- USA Water Polo

=== Track ===
- AAU
- Amsterdam Marathon
- Big Ten
- Big 12
- Great Manchester Run
- Great North Run
- London Marathon
- Marathon De Paris
- MileSplit
- NCAA
- Stumptown Twilight
- Under Armour Sunset Tour

=== Volleyball ===
- Big Ten
- Big 12
- Coastal Athletic Association
- FIV3
- Panamerican Cup
- NCAA
- Nike Tournament of Championship

=== Wrestling ===
- Actec Warrior Championship
- Big Ten
- Fight To Win
- NCAA

== Controversy ==
FloSports's contract with USA Gymnastics was canceled one year into a five-year agreement after backlash from organizers. The website had previously linked to nude photos of McKayla Maroney that were taken when she was still a minor.

In 2017, less than a year after partnering with WWNLive, they sued the latter company claiming they were misled about Pay-Per-View revenue. The suit was dismissed after the contract was made public, and it was revealed that FloSports was upset with WWNLive's use of funds.

In 2016, the US Olympic Committee revoked FloSports' media credentials after they repeatedly published footage that NBC held exclusive rights to.

For several years their subscription model has emphasized the per-month price, while the actual subscription was billed annually. As a consequence, in 2022 a class action lawsuit was filed against FloSports in New York federal court due to their business practices. The suit claimed that FloSports misleads customers into believing they are only being charged a monthly fee — rather than the full annual fee — when they first sign up for the sports streaming service.' FloSports later settled this case out of court in November 2023.
