= NBA draft =

National Basketball Association Draft

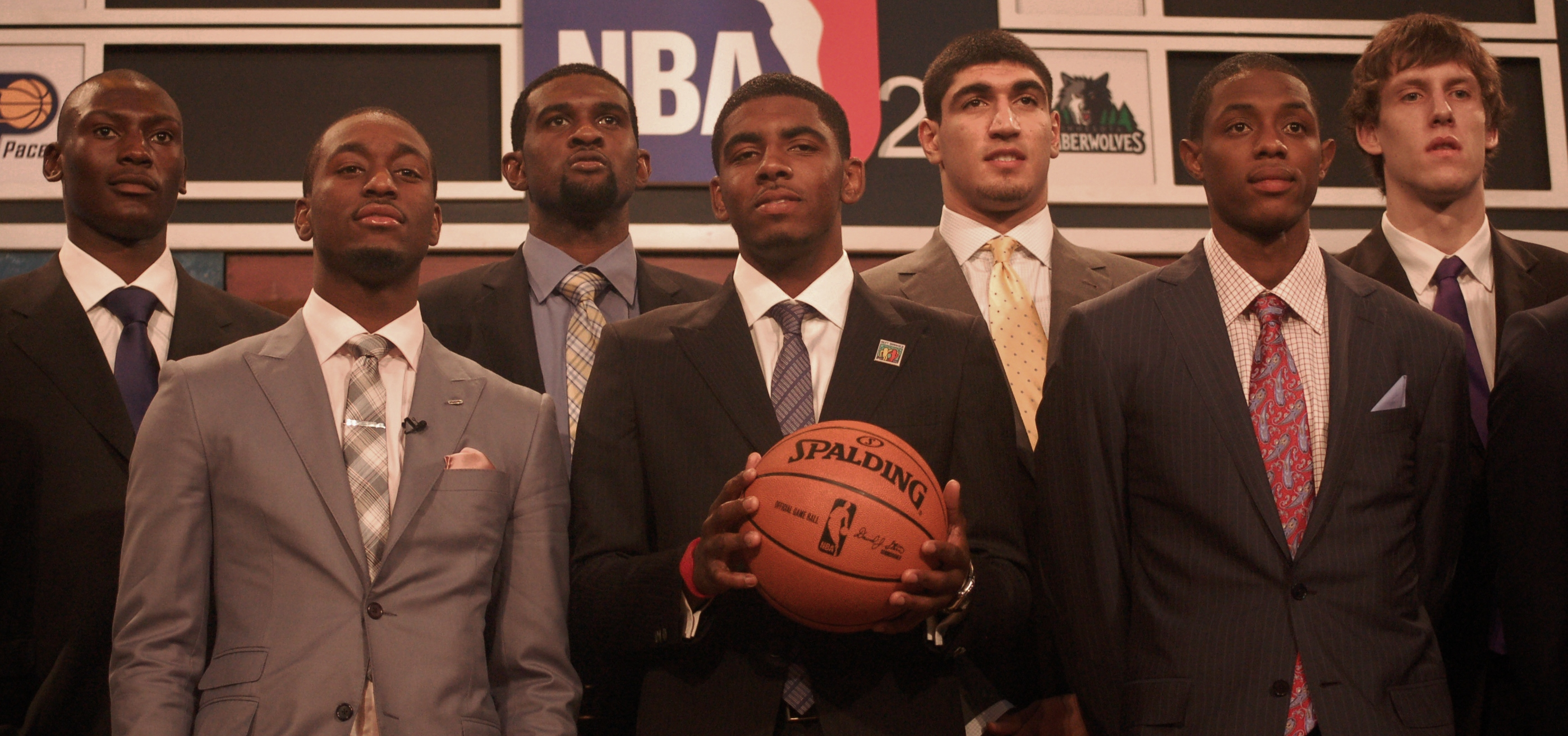
Rookies from the 2011 NBA draft on draft night

The NBA draft is an annual National Basketball Association's (NBA) event, dating back to 1947, in which the teams in the league draft players to join their organizations who are eligible and who declare for the draft. The NBA consists of 30 teams, and all thirty have at least one draft pick throughout the two draft rounds. Historically, the vast majority of players drafted into the NBA are college basketball players.

It has become common for players to also be drafted from international professional leagues, the G League Ignite team, and youth professional basketball leagues. College players who have finished their four-year college eligibility are automatically eligible for selection, while the underclassmen have to declare their eligibility and give up their remaining college eligibility. International players who are at least 22 years old are automatically eligible for selection, while the players younger than 22 have to declare their eligibility. Players who are not automatically eligible but have declared their eligibility are often called "early-entrants" or "early-entry candidates". Selecting a player in the draft is one of the most important decisions for NBA front offices because of the effect it can have on the team, such as having many players playing in the same position, or that high overall draft pick turning out to be a bust, not only for next season, but also for the longevity of the franchise.

The draft usually takes place near the end of June, during the NBA offseason. Since 1989, the draft has consisted of two rounds; this is much shorter than the entry drafts of the other major professional sports leagues in the United States and Canada, all of which run at least seven rounds. Sixty players are selected in each draft. No player may sign with the NBA until he has been eligible for at least one draft.

In the past, high school players were also eligible to be selected. However, starting in the 2006 draft, high school players were not eligible to enter the draft directly after graduating from high school. The eligibility rules for the draft state that high school players will gain eligibility for draft selection one year after their high school graduation, and they must also be at least 19 years old as of the end of the calendar year of the draft.

Some players have chosen to use that year to play professionally overseas, for example Brandon Jennings (Italy), Emmanuel Mudiay (China), and Terrance Ferguson (Australia). Thon Maker was eligible for the 2016 draft despite not going to college because he chose to undertake a postgraduate year, so he was technically one year removed from graduation.

== Draft selection process ==
Some players must be at least 19 years of age during the calendar year of the draft, and a player who completed basketball eligibility at an American high school must also be at least one year removed from the graduation of his high school class. Restrictions exist on players signing with sports agents and on declaring for, then withdrawing from, drafts—although most of them are enforced by the NCAA rather than the NBA. A total of 45 players have been drafted directly from high school into the NBA, with the practice becoming more common in the late 1990s and early 2000s before the league implemented an age limit in 2005. Any players who are not an "international player" must be at least one year out of the graduation of his high school class in order for them to qualify for the upcoming draft. Not many high school players went directly to the NBA draft for almost 20 years after Darryl Dawkins in 1975 because of the exposure of the college games.

In the early years of the draft, teams would select players until they ran out of prospects. The 1960 and 1968 drafts went as long as 21 rounds. By 1974, it had stabilized to 10 rounds (except 1977, when the rounds were eight following the addition of four former ABA teams joining the NBA via the ABA-NBA merger), which held up until 1985, when the draft was shortened to seven rounds. By agreement with the National Basketball Players Association, the drafts from 1989 onward have been limited to two rounds, which gives undrafted players the chance to try out for any team.

From 1956 through 1965, teams could use a territorial pick in which they forfeited their first-round selection in order to choose a player from their immediate area. The player presumably had a strong local following to boost fan interest. With territorial picks eliminated in 1966, replaced by a coin flip for the rights to first overall pick, the 1966 draft is considered the first modern NBA draft.

From 2009 through 2015, the college underclassmen had until the day before the April signing period to withdraw their name from the draft and retain NCAA eligibility. Since 2016, players could enter the draft and participate in the NBA draft combine multiple times and retain NCAA eligibility by withdrawing from the draft within 10 days after the end of the mid-May NBA draft combine.

== Draft lottery ==
The NBA draft lottery is an annual event held by the NBA, where the teams who did not make the playoffs in the past year participate in a state-lottery style process in order to determine the order that the first several teams pick players in the draft. The lottery covered the first three picks until 2018, after which it was increased to the first four. The team with the worst record receives the best odds of receiving the first pick. The NBA introduced the lottery process in 1985. The league was attempting to counter accusations that certain teams were purposefully losing in order to gain a chance to participate in the annual coin flip, where the worst team in each division (each conference starting in 1971) flipped a coin to see who will receive the first pick in that year's upcoming draft.

The draft lottery is a crucial component of the NBA Draft, primarily determining the order of the top 14 picks, known as the lottery picks. These picks are assigned to the 14 teams that did not make the playoffs in the previous season. In the lottery system, the league uses "a lottery-style ping-pong ball machine with 14 balls numbered 1–14, and 1,000 four-digit combinations are assigned to the 14 lottery teams." Until 2018, the worst team received 250 combinations, the second worst getting 199, the third worst team 156, and so on. The first three draft picks were determined. Starting in 2019, the three worst teams receive 140 combinations each, the fourth worst 125, and so on. Those three teams will have an equal chance of winning the top overall pick. After the first four picks are determined, the rest of the teams are ordered in reverse order based on their record in the previous season, like in the previous system.

The lottery is generally held in the third or fourth week of May. The NBA goes to great lengths in order to keep the selection process both fair and not tampered with in any way. "The actual Lottery procedure will take place in a separate room just prior to the national broadcast on ESPN. Select media members, NBA officials and representatives of the participating teams and the accounting firm of Ernst & Young will be in attendance for the drawing." Attendees are not allowed cell phone or any other electronic access until the number one pick is revealed on the television broadcast.

== Trades ==
The NBA allows teams to trade draft picks, with all of a team's first and second round draft picks in the next 7 drafts being tradable.

Draft picks in the NBA can be unprotected or protected. With unprotected picks the team who receives the pick is guaranteed to have the pick no matter where it falls, whereas a protected pick allows the team who trades a pick to retain it if it falls within a current range (such as being a top-5 pick or a draft lottery pick) with them often agreeing to give the team who receives the pick an unprotected pick in the following year's draft as compensation. As a result of this unprotected picks are generally considered more valuable than protected picks.

Another common draft pick trade is a pick swap. Under this trade the team who receives the pick is given the right to swap picks with the other team if they are better or retain their pick if it turns out to be better pick than the draft pick of the team who traded the pick.

Under current NBA rules a team must have at least one first round pick (which can either be their own pick or another team's pick) in every other draft under the Stepien Rule.

== Globalization of the draft ==
Collegiate players dominated the NBA draft for decades since its inception in 1950. From 1995 to 2005, NBA teams drafted a slew of just-graduated high school standouts like Kobe Bryant, LeBron James, Kevin Garnett, Dwight Howard, Tracy McGrady and Amar'e Stoudemire. To counteract this, the NBA implemented an age requirement in July 2005. This meant that high school seniors were no longer eligible for the NBA draft in 2006 and thereafter.

The league did allow draft eligibility for high school postgraduates, as long as they were at least one year removed from their high school graduation and were 19 years old by the time they entered the league. This option was exercised first in 2015 when Indian prospect Satnam Singh Bhamara was drafted in the second round and again in 2016 when South Sudanese–Australian prospect Thon Maker was drafted in the first round.

=== Selecting foreign players ===
Foreign players have made a large impact on how teams draft. Early on, foreigners were not part of the draft. The NBA's appeal was limited to the United States and the league was not yet attempting to expand internationally. The first foreign player, in the sense of being a national of a country other than the U.S., to be chosen first overall in the draft was Bahamian Mychal Thompson in 1978. However, Thompson's selection was not a true harbinger of the game's globalization, as he had spent much of his childhood in Florida, and had played college basketball at Minnesota. One of the first foreign players selected in the draft to play in the NBA was Manute Bol out of the Sudan in 1983 in the 5th round by the San Diego Clippers. Bol's selection was later deemed ineligible by the NBA. Two years later Bol was drafted again by the NBA, this time out of Division II University of Bridgeport in 1985 as the 31st pick overall in the second round. Although Bol did not have a stellar career, he is known for being one of the tallest players ever to play the game at 7 feet and 7 inches. He holds the record for being the tallest player ever to hit a 3-point field goal. The following two years saw two players born outside the U.S. selected first overall—Nigerian Hakeem Olajuwon in 1984 (he would later gain U.S. citizenship) and Jamaica-born American Patrick Ewing in 1985.

By the late 1990s, the number of foreign-born players drafted had dramatically increased. Some commentators incorrectly designate the top pick in the 1997 NBA draft, Tim Duncan, as the third international player picked number 1 overall. But Duncan is from the United States Virgin Islands and, like all USVI natives, is a U.S. citizen by birth. He also had played U.S. college basketball at Wake Forest. Not counting Duncan, 11 international players were selected in the two rounds of the 1997 draft. Like top-pick Duncan, 5 of those 11 players (including the second and third overall picks) had played college basketball in the U.S. The 1998 draft saw another foreign player picked first overall, Nigerian Michael Olowokandi, but like Duncan he had played college basketball, in his case at Pacific. The foreign player drafted highest in 2001 was Pau Gasol, selected third overall by the Atlanta Hawks. In 2002, Yao Ming became the first foreign player without U.S. college experience to be selected number 1 overall. Not only was the first overall pick an international player that year, but five more picks in the first round alone were also from overseas. In total, the 2002 draft produced 17 international players, with only three of them (all second-round picks) having U.S. college experience.

=== International players selected number 1 overall ===
Four international players had gone first overall before 2002, although all had played college basketball in the U.S., and one of them was in fact a U.S. citizen by birth. It was not until 2002 that an international player without college experience went first overall—Yao Ming. His selection was not only a watershed moment for the NBA, but it also had a large impact in Yao's homeland of China. Hannah Beech (2003) wrote "Yao has single-handedly transformed his countrymen from nameless, faceless millions into mighty men who can jam with the very best". Yao has helped the NBA grow into a worldwide product. Beech (2003) goes on to write "Ratings for NBA games broadcast on Chinese TV have never been higher than this year as the nation keeps track of its new favorite team, Yao's Houston Rockets". For his career Yao averaged a solid 19.0 points per game, 9.2 rebounds per game, 1.89 blocks per game, and shot 82.6 percent from the free throw line. It had later gotten to a point where the last four drafts from 2013 to 2016 all held international prospects as No. 1 selections in their respective drafts before ending the run in 2017.

The 2002, 2005, 2006, 2011, 2013, 2014, 2015, 2016, 2018, 2023, and 2024 NBA drafts saw international players picked first overall. In 2005, the Milwaukee Bucks picked Andrew Bogut, from Australia by way of the University of Utah, No. 1. The next year, the Toronto Raptors drafted Andrea Bargnani from Italy, making him the second foreign player without U.S. college experience and the first European to be selected number 1 overall. In 2011, Australian born Kyrie Irving was selected by the Cleveland Cavaliers after having played one year at Duke. In 2013, the Cleveland Cavaliers selected Anthony Bennett, who played at UNLV, first overall and making Bennett the first Canadian to be drafted at No. 1. In the 2014 NBA draft, the Cleveland Cavaliers, again picking No. 1, selected Canadian shooting guard/small forward Andrew Wiggins. During the 2015 NBA draft, the Minnesota Timberwolves selected U.S.-born center Karl-Anthony Towns, also born with Dominican Republic citizenship by way of his mother, as the first player from the latter country and therefore the first Latin American to become the No. 1 selection, teaming up with Andrew Wiggins in the process. During the 2016 NBA draft, the Philadelphia 76ers selected Australian forward Ben Simmons to be the No. 1 selection. In the 2018 NBA draft, the Phoenix Suns selected Bahamian center Deandre Ayton as their first ever No. 1 selection, with Ayton being the second Bahamian taken at No. 1 behind Mychal Thompson, and the third Caribbean-born player after Patrick Ewing and Thompson. In the 2023 NBA draft, the San Antonio Spurs selected Frenchman Victor Wembanyama with the No. 1 selection, making him the first French player to be drafted at No.1. It also made him the third foreign player without U.S. college experience and the second European to be selected number 1 overall. In the 2024 NBA draft, the Atlanta Hawks selected Frenchman Zaccharie Risacher with the No. 1 selection.

== Notable past NBA drafts ==
Some of the most noted NBA draft years are 1984, 1996, 2003 and 2011. The 2003 NBA draft was noted for bringing several future superstars into the league, such as LeBron James, Dwyane Wade, Carmelo Anthony and Chris Bosh. The draft of 1986 was also notable for the number of solid or outstanding players selected in later rounds, partly because of drug problems that claimed the life of second overall pick Len Bias and affected the careers of several other first-round picks.

On the other hand, the draft of 2000 has been regarded as the worst in NBA history, with Sports Illustrated calling its first round "a horrible group of players". The 2013 draft has also been called underwhelming, although Victor Oladipo and Rudy Gobert eventually became All-Stars, and Giannis Antetokounmpo later became a two time NBA MVP.

NBA 1st Overall Picks since 2000

| Draft | Selected by | Player | Nationality | Position | College/ high school/ former club | NBA rookie statistics | | | Ref. |
| Draft | Selected by | Player | Nationality | Position | College/ high school/ former club | PPG | RPG | APG | Ref. |
|---|---|---|---|---|---|---|---|---|---|
| 2000 | New Jersey Nets | Kenyon Martin | United States | Forward | Cincinnati | 12.0 | 7.4 | 1.9 | |
| 2001 | Washington Wizards | Kwame Brown | United States | Center | Glynn Academy HS (Brunswick, Georgia) | 4.5 | 3.5 | 0.8 | |
| 2002 | Houston Rockets | Yao Ming | China | Center | Shanghai Sharks (China) | 13.5 | 8.2 | 1.7 | |
| 2003 | Cleveland Cavaliers | LeBron James | United States | Forward | St. Vincent–St. Mary HS (Akron, Ohio) | 20.9 | 5.5 | 5.9 | |
| 2004 | Orlando Magic | Dwight Howard | United States | Center | SACA (Atlanta) | 12.0 | 10.0 | 0.9 | |
| 2005 | Milwaukee Bucks | Andrew Bogut | Australia | Center | Utah | 9.4 | 7.0 | 2.3 | |
| 2006 | Toronto Raptors | Andrea Bargnani | Italy | Forward/center | Benetton Treviso (Italy) | 11.6 | 3.9 | 0.8 | |
| 2007 | Portland Trail Blazers | Greg Oden (Note: Greg Oden underwent microfracture surgery on his right knee before the 2007–08 season, and missed the entire season. His rookie statistics are from the 2008–09 season.) | United States | Center | Ohio State | 8.9 | 7.0 | 0.5 | |
| 2008 | Chicago Bulls | Derrick Rose | United States | Guard | Memphis | 16.8 | 3.9 | 6.3 | |
| 2009 | Los Angeles Clippers | Blake Griffin | United States | Forward | Oklahoma | 22.5 | 12.1 | 3.8 | |
| 2010 | Washington Wizards | John Wall | United States | Guard | Kentucky | 16.4 | 4.6 | 8.3 | |
| 2011 | Cleveland Cavaliers | Kyrie Irving | United States (Note: Kyrie Irving was born in Australia to American parents who returned to the U.S. when he was two years old. He has played for the U.S. internationally at both youth and senior level.) | Guard | Duke | 18.5 | 3.7 | 5.4 | |
| 2012 | New Orleans Hornets | Anthony Davis | United States | Forward/center | Kentucky | 13.5 | 8.2 | 1.0 | |
| 2013 | Cleveland Cavaliers | Anthony Bennett | Canada | Forward | UNLV | 4.2 | 3.0 | 0.3 | |
| 2014 | Cleveland Cavaliers | Andrew Wiggins | Canada | Forward/guard | Kansas | 16.9 | 4.6 | 2.1 | |
| 2015 | Minnesota Timberwolves | Karl-Anthony Towns | Dominican Republic (Note: Karl-Anthony Towns was born and raised in the United States; his mother is Dominican. He has chosen to represent the Dominican Republic at the international level.) | Center | Kentucky | 18.3 | 10.4 | 2.0 | |
| 2016 | Philadelphia 76ers | Ben Simmons | Australia (Note: Simmons was born in Melbourne, Australia, to an American father and Australian mother. He chose to represent Australia at international level.) | Forward/guard | LSU | 15.8 | 8.1 | 8.2 | |
| 2017 | Philadelphia 76ers | Markelle Fultz | United States | Guard | Washington | 7.1 | 3.1 | 3.8 | |
| 2018 | Phoenix Suns | Deandre Ayton | Bahamas | Center | Arizona | 16.3 | 10.3 | 1.8 | |
| 2019 | New Orleans Pelicans | Zion Williamson | United States | Forward | Duke | 22.5 | 6.3 | 2.1 | |
| 2020 | Minnesota Timberwolves | Anthony Edwards | United States | Guard | Georgia | 19.3 | 4.7 | 2.9 | |
| 2021 | Detroit Pistons | Cade Cunningham | United States | Guard | Oklahoma State | 17.4 | 5.5 | 5.6 | |
| 2022 | Orlando Magic | Paolo Banchero | United States | Forward | Duke | 20.0 | 6.9 | 3.7 | |
| 2023 | San Antonio Spurs | Victor Wembanyama | France | Center/forward | Metropolitans 92 (France) | 21.4 | 10.6 | 3.9 | |
| 2024 | Atlanta Hawks | Zaccharie Risacher | France | Forward | JL Bourg (France) | 12.6 | 3.6 | 1.2 | |
| 2025 | Dallas Mavericks | Cooper Flagg | United States | Forward | Duke | 21.0 | 6.7 | 4.5 | |
| 2026 | Washington Wizards | AJ Dybantsa | United States | Forward | BYU | — | — | — | |

== NBA draft on television ==
The NBA draft has been televised since 1980, the same year the NFL and NHL televised (or publicized) theirs. USA Network broadcast the draft as part of its contract with the NBA until 1984; starting in 1985, TBS did so as part of its NBA on TBS package. From 1990 to 2002, TNT took over the draft as more NBA properties moved to the network (the NBA on TNT). When ESPN acquired the rights to the NBA from NBC in 2002, ESPN began broadcasting the draft (starting in 2003) with the NBA on ESPN, which it continues to do today. It was also televised on broadcast television for the first time on ABC in 2021. NBA TV has also produced its own coverage since coming under the purview of Turner Sports since 2008.

== See also ==
- Draftnik
- List of first overall NBA draft picks
- Mock draft
- Draft bust
- Expansion draft
- Haywood v. National Basketball Association
- NBA high school draftees
- WNBA draft
