= Mel Kiper Jr. =

American football analyst (born 1960)

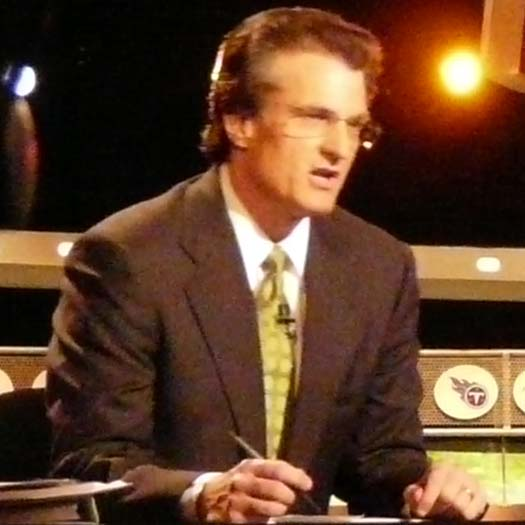
- Kiper in 2009
- Born: July 25, 1960 (age 65); Baltimore, Maryland, U.S.
- Occupation: Football commentator
- Years active: 1984–present
- Employer: ESPN

Mel Kiper Jr. (/ˈkaɪpər/ KY-pər; born July 25, 1960) is an American analyst covering football for ESPN. Kiper has appeared on ESPN's annual NFL draft coverage since 1984. He has been widely credited for establishing mock drafting and is regarded as one of the first draftniks alongside Joel Buchsbaum.

== Career ==
Kiper said that he approached Ernie Accorsi, then-assistant general manager of the Baltimore Colts, with draft reports while still a student in high school. Accorsi told him that there was a market for draft information and suggested that Kiper convert his analysis into a business. The original contract he signed with ESPN in 1984 was for $400.

Kiper and fellow draft analyst Todd McShay were often featured together and compared their mock drafts on ESPN programs. Kiper compiles a "big board", on which he ranks his top 25 players every week.

One of the best known moments of Kiper's career was during the 1994 NFL draft, when he butted heads with Indianapolis Colts general manager Bill Tobin. Kiper, then relatively unknown as an analyst, derided the Colts for passing on Trent Dilfer after trading up to the fifth pick. Tobin retorted in an interview, "Who the hell is Mel Kiper?" and noted that Kiper has "never put on a jockstrap." Kiper also remarked at the draft that the Colts were "the laughingstock of the league year in and year out," which a bemused Chris Berman noted as marking "a day which will live in infamy." When Tobin died in 2024, Kiper offered condolences on social media.

=== Accuracy ===
Kiper has received sustained criticism for the low accuracy of his predictions. According to Cold Hard Football Facts, Kiper's accuracy for the first round of the 2005–2008 NFL drafts was 32 of 127 total picks (25.2%), which included players that had already signed or were in the process of signing with a team before the draft. According to The Huddle Report in 2014, based on Kiper's final mock drafts, he had accurately predicted 23% of the first round picks in the previous five years. Kiper's initial drafts were even lower, correctly predicting 17 out of 256 from 2010 to 2018. In 2021, FantasyPros ranked Kiper's final mock draft 87th of 182 and Grading the Experts ranked his draft 32nd of 38. In 2023, Kiper correctly predicted only one of the 31 draftees in the first round despite updating his analysis on the morning of the NFL draft after gathering additional information.

== In other media ==
- Kiper voices himself as the ESPN draft expert, has his own mock draft in ESPN NFL 2K5 and is "unlockable" as a free agent longsnapper.
- Kiper appears in NFL Head Coach as a draft expert.
- Kiper appears in Madden NFL 07 and 08 during the pre-draft workout period.

== Personal life ==
Kiper was born in Baltimore, Maryland. He attended Essex Community College but did not graduate. His wife Kim, whom he married in 1989, assists him in running Mel Kiper Enterprises from their Baltimore home; he founded the company while in college in 1981. They have one daughter.
