= Draftnik =

Person who covers sports drafts

A draftnik is a person who studies professional sports leagues drafts. Draftnik activities can include watching game footage of upcoming prospects and discussing mock draft rankings. The term is most often used in reference to the NFL draft and was coined in the mid-1980s after the draft was first televised by ESPN.

The first draftniks are typically considered to be Joel Buchsbaum and Mel Kiper Jr.
