= Joel Buchsbaum =

American sportswriter (1954–2002)

- Born: September 8, 1954; Brooklyn, New York, U.S.
- Died: December 27, 2002 (aged 48); Brooklyn, New York, U.S.
- Occupation: Sports writer
- Years active: 1979-2002
- Employer: Pro Football Weekly
- Parent(s): Stanley Buchsbaum, Frances Buchsbaum

Joel Buchsbaum (September 8, 1954 – December 27, 2002) was an American sportswriter who worked for Pro Football Weekly from 1979 until his death.

== Career ==
Buchsbaum was noted especially for his NFL draft analysis and evaluation of college football players. He was a guest commentator for KMOX in St. Louis and KTRH in Houston. He is considered one of the first "draft experts" in sports media. In 2003, he posthumously received the Dick McCann Memorial Award from the Pro Football Hall of Fame.

== Death ==
On December 27, 2002, Buchsbaum died at his home in Brooklyn of natural causes.
