= National Bowl Game =

Annual football game

- Trillion CFBALL National Bowl
- Stadium: Celebration Stadium
- Location: Celebration, Florida
- Previous stadiums: J. Birney Crum Stadium (2011–2012); Riccardo Silva Stadium (2013–2015); Municipal Stadium (2016–2017); Spec Martin Stadium (2018–2021)
- Previous locations: Allentown, Pennsylvania (2011–2012); Miami, Florida (2013–2015); Daytona Beach, Florida (2016–2017); DeLand, Florida (2018–2021)
- Operated: 2011–present

The National Bowl Game is an American independently operated post-season college football all-star game played annually since 2011, most often in December. The game showcases NFL draft prospects of those collegiate players who have completed their eligibility in NCAA Division II, NCAA Division III, and the NAIA. Since 2014, the game has been played as a doubleheader with the FCS Bowl.

== History ==
The National Bowl Game was first played in April 2011 at J. Birney Crum Stadium in Allentown, Pennsylvania. Subsequent games have been held in December, and in 2013 the game moved to Riccardo Silva Stadium on the campus of Florida International University (FIU). After three years at FIU, the game moved to Municipal Stadium in Daytona Beach, Florida. It has subsequently moved to other locations in Florida.

The game has been organized by East Preps LLC, who operate the game independently. As of 2023, the game is branded as the College Football Alumni Association (CFBALL) National Bowl.

The game and an associated scouting combine provide opportunity for players from smaller colleges to get exposure with scouts from various professional leagues, including the NFL and CFL. Organizers report that 26 players from the December 2015 games (National Bowl Game and FCS Bowl) reached the NFL in some capacity. At the December 2016 game, 14 NFL teams were represented, with over 30 scouts in attendance.

== Game results ==
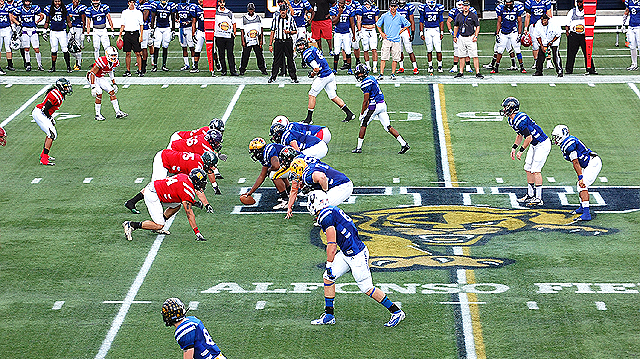
National Bowl Game in Miami

No.	Date	Winning team		Losing team		Stadium	City	Ref.
1	April 10, 2011	Blue Nation	10	Red Nation	7	J. Birney Crum Stadium	Allentown, PA	
2	December 4, 2011	Blue Nation	34	Red Nation	31	J. Birney Crum Stadium	Allentown, PA	
3	December 9, 2012	Red Nation	35	Blue Nation	21	J. Birney Crum Stadium	Allentown, PA	
4	December 8, 2013	Red Nation	40	Blue Nation	26	Riccardo Silva Stadium	Miami, FL	
5	December 7, 2014	Blue Nation	14	Red Nation	7	Riccardo Silva Stadium	Miami, FL	
6	December 6, 2015	American	16	National	9	Riccardo Silva Stadium	Miami, FL	
7	December 4, 2016	American	16	National	9	Municipal Stadium	Daytona Beach, FL	
8	December 10, 2017	American	48	National	13	Municipal Stadium	Daytona Beach, FL	
9	December 9, 2018	American	16	National	13	Municipal Stadium	Daytona Beach, FL	
10	December 8, 2019	National	31	American	29	Spec Martin Stadium	DeLand, FL	
11	January 20, 2024	National	27	American	6	Celebration Stadium	Celebration, FL	

Note: during February 2023, organizers held a "National Pro Combine Day" in lieu of a game.

== MVPs ==
Overall MVPs of each game are listed below. Some additional awards not listed are also given, for offensive and defensive player of each team, special teams player, lineman, and the James Pratt Courage Award.

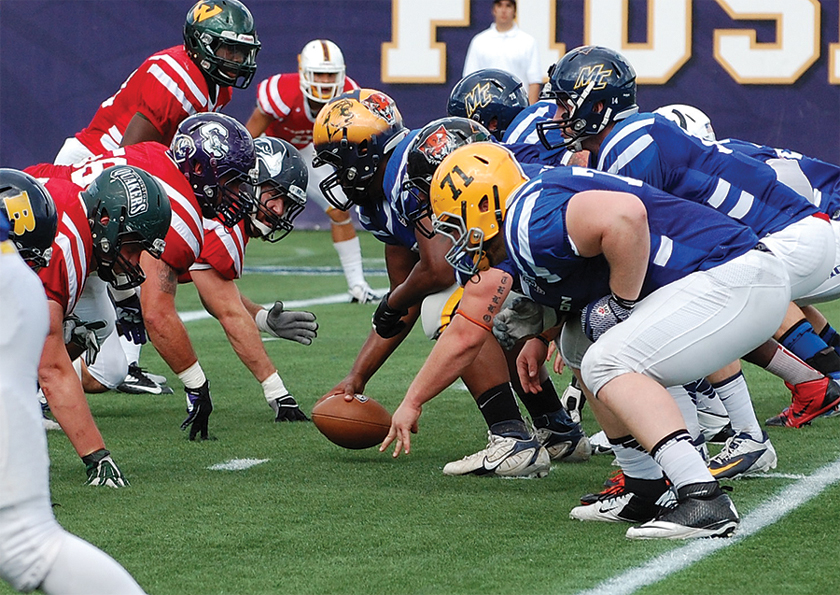
National Bowl Game in Miami

Year	MVP	Pos.	College
2011 (Apr.)	Beau Reed	TE	Fairleigh Dickinson University
2011 (Dec.)	Jordan Griffin	SB	Glenville State College
2012	Scott Pillar	WR	Albright College
2013	Mason Espinosa	QB	Ohio Wesleyan University
2014	Bobby Brown	QB	Buena Vista College
2015	Travis Sparks	RB	University of La Verne
2016	Michael Everett	CB	Southwest Minnesota State University
2017	Patrick O'Brien	QB	Catawba College
2018	Trent White	QB	Westminster College (MO)
2019	Matt McDonald	RB/KR	Upper Iowa University

== See also ==
- List of college bowl games
