= NFL draft =

Annual event determining player selections

Logo of the NFL draft

The NFL draft, officially known as the Annual Player Selection Meeting, is an annual event which serves as the most common source of player recruitment in the National Football League (NFL). Since 2026, the event has been held on the fourth Thursday of April to the fourth Saturday of April. Each team is given a position in the drafting order in reverse order relative to its record in the previous year, which means that the team with the worst record is positioned first and the Super Bowl champion is last. For teams that had the same record, their position in the draft order for each round rotates in some way amongst the teams with tied records. From this position, the team can either select a player or trade its position to another team for other draft positions, a player, or players, or any combination thereof. The round is complete when each team has either selected a player or traded its position in the draft. The first draft was held in 1936 and has been held every year since.

Certain aspects of the draft, including team positioning and the number of rounds in the draft, have been revised since its creation, but the fundamental method has remained the same. Currently, the draft consists of seven rounds. The original rationale in creating the draft was to increase the competitive parity between the teams as the worst team would, ideally, be able to choose the best player available. In the early years of the draft, players were chosen based on hearsay, print media, or other rudimentary evidence of ability. In the 1940s, some franchises began employing full-time scouts. The ensuing success of these teams eventually forced the other franchises to also hire scouts.

Colloquially, the name of the draft each year takes on the form of the NFL season in which players picked could begin playing. For example, the 2010 NFL draft was for the 2010 NFL season. However, the NFL-defined name of the process has changed since its inception. The location of the draft has continually changed over the years to accommodate more fans, as the event has gained popularity. The draft's popularity now garners prime-time television coverage. In the league's early years, from the mid-1930s to the mid-1960s, the draft was held in various cities with NFL franchises until the league settled on New York City starting in 1965, where it remained for fifty years until 2015, when future draft locations started being determined through a yearly bidding process.

== History ==
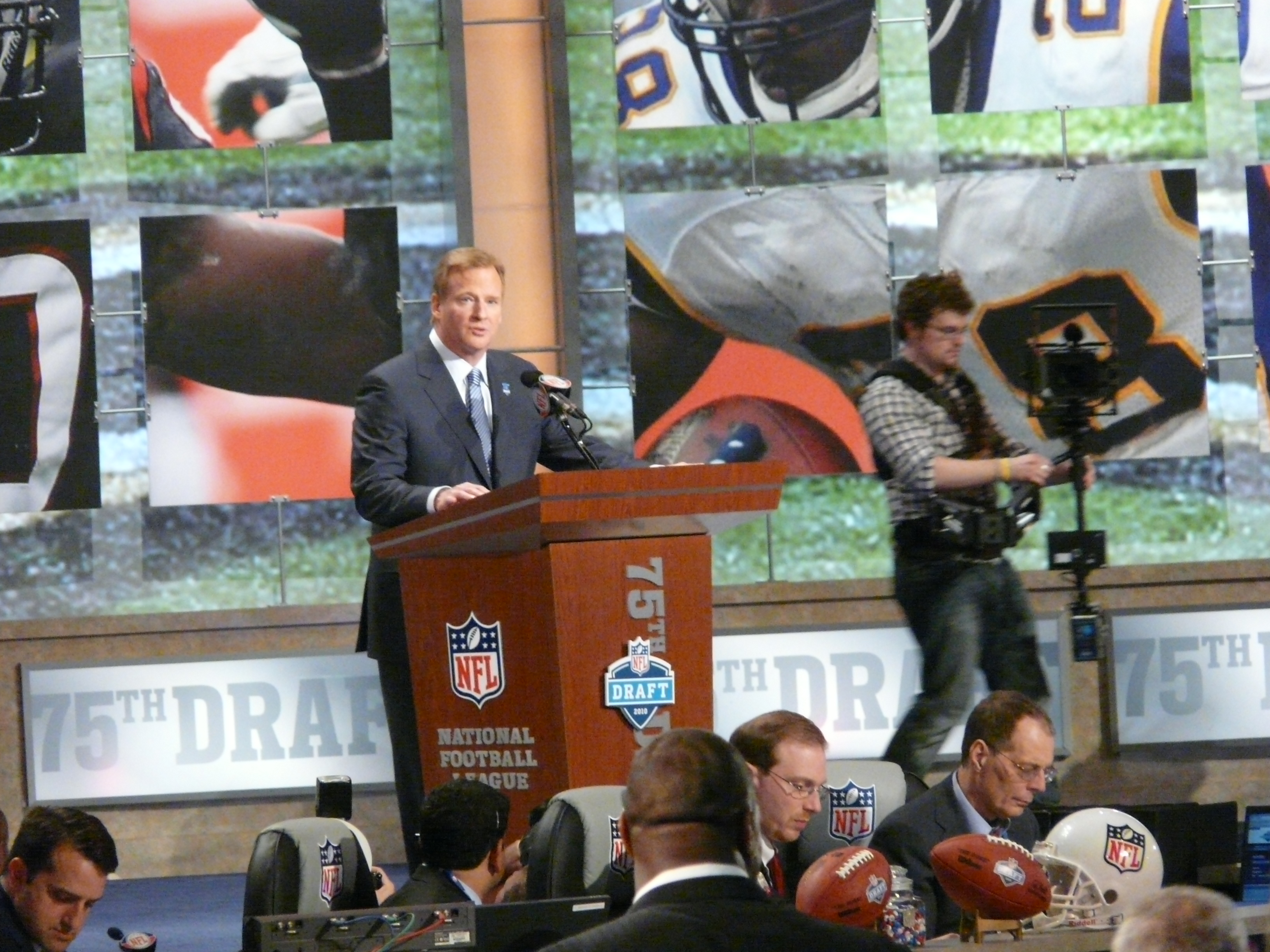
League commissioner Roger Goodell announcing a team's selection at the 2010 NFL draft

In the early 1930s, Stan Kostka had an excellent college career as a University of Minnesota running back, leading the Minnesota Gophers to an undefeated season in 1934. Every NFL team wanted to sign him. Kostka took advantage of the lack of a draft and held out for the highest possible offer. While a free agent, he even ran for Mayor of Inver Grove Heights, Minnesota. Although his political career did not take off, Kostka's nine-month NFL holdout succeeded and he became the league's highest-paid player, signing a $5,000 contract with the Brooklyn Dodgers on August 25, 1935. As a response to the bidding war for Stan Kostka, the NFL instituted the draft in 1936.

In late 1935, Art Rooney, owner of the Pittsburgh Steelers, gave the right of usage of two players to the New York Giants because Rooney's team had no chance to participate in the postseason. After the owner of the Boston Redskins, George Preston Marshall, protested the transaction, the president of the NFL, Joe F. Carr, disallowed the Giants the ability to employ the players. At a league meeting in December 1934, the NFL introduced a waiver rule to prevent such transactions. Any player released by a team during the season would be able to be claimed by other teams. The selection order to claim the player would be in inverse order to the teams' standings at the time.

Throughout this time, Bert Bell, co-owner of the Philadelphia Eagles, felt his team's lack of competitiveness on the field made it difficult for the Eagles to sell tickets and to be profitable. Compounding the Eagles' problems were players signed with teams that offered the most money, or if the money being equal, players chose to sign with the most prestigious teams at the time, who had established a winning tradition. As a result, the NFL was dominated by the Chicago Bears, Green Bay Packers, Giants, and Redskins. Bell's inability to sign a desired prospect, Stan Kostka, in 1935, eventually led Bell to believe the only way for the NFL to have enduring success was for all teams to have an equal opportunity to sign eligible players. At a league meeting on May 18, 1935, Bell proposed a draft be instituted to enhance the possibility of competitive parity on the field in order to ensure the financial viability of all franchises. His proposal was adopted unanimously that day, although the first draft would not occur until the next off-season.

The rules for the selection of the players in the first draft were, first, that a list of college seniors would be assembled by each franchise and submitted into a pool. From this pool, each franchise would select, in inverse order to their team's record in the previous year, a player. With this selection, the franchise had the unilateral right to negotiate a contract with that player, or the ability to trade that player to another team for a player, or players. If, for any reason, the franchise was unsuccessful in negotiating a contract with the player and was unable to trade the player, the president of the NFL could attempt to arbitrate a settlement between the player and the franchise. If the president was unable to settle the dispute, then the player would be placed in the reserve list of the franchise and would be unavailable to play for any team in the NFL that year. In the 1935 NFL season, the Eagles finished in last place at 2–9, thus securing themselves the first pick in the draft.

=== The first draft (1936) ===
The first NFL draft began at the Ritz-Carlton Hotel in Philadelphia on February 8, 1936. Ninety names were written on a blackboard in the meeting room from which the teams would choose. As no team had a scouting department, the list was created from either print media sources, visits to local colleges by team executives, or by recommendations to team executives. The draft would last for nine rounds, and it had no media coverage. The first player selected in the draft was Jay Berwanger. Bell, prior to the draft, was not successfully able to negotiate a contract with Berwanger so Bell traded him to the Bears. George Halas, owner of the Bears, was also unsuccessful in signing Berwanger. Berwanger's decision to not play in the NFL was not unusual, as only twenty-four of the eighty-one players selected chose to play in the NFL that year. The draft was recessed on the first day and it was continued and finished on the next day.

This draft saw the emergence of Wellington Mara as a savant, as he had been subscribing to magazines and local and out-of-town papers to build up dossiers of college players across the country, which resulted in the Giants' drafting of Tuffy Leemans. As a result of the institution of the draft, Tim Mara, owner of the Giants, reduced Ken Strong's salary offer to $3,200 from $6,000 a year for 1936 because Mara felt the draft would alter the salary structure of the NFL. Generally, the franchises' exclusivity in negotiating with draft picks produced the immediate effect of, depending on sources, stopping the escalating salaries of new players, or reducing their salaries. Consequently, contemporary critics charged it was anti-labor.

=== Early drafts (1937–1946) ===
Art Rooney, owner of the Pittsburgh Steelers, chose Byron "Whizzer" White in the first round of the 1938 draft despite White's known public declaration that he would not play professional football and would instead begin work on his Rhodes scholarship. White did, however, agree to play for the 1938 season after Rooney publicly gave him a guaranteed contract of $15,000, double what any other player had made in the NFL. The size of the dollar amount brought condemnation from other owners because it altered the pay expectations of college draftees. For the 1939 draft Wellington, for the first time, was put in charge of drafting players for the Giants. He submitted the list of players into the pool that the Giants—or other franchises—could choose players from. However, in the first round he selected a player, Walt Nielsen, not on the list of players that the Giants or any other franchise had submitted. With a grin Wellington stated, "I didn't think I said I put every name on that list."

In 1939, Kenny Washington was, to no small extent, viewed as one of the greatest college football players of all time. After information was made available to at least one owner of a franchise that Washington was African-American, he was not drafted by any team for the 1940 NFL draft.

The draft would be eventually codified into the NFL Constitution, although no information is available on when that originally occurred.

"Bullet Bill" Dudley was the first overall pick in the 1942 draft and he would eventually become the first player picked first overall in the draft to enter the Pro Football Hall of Fame.

=== Scouting era begins (1946–1959) ===
Eddie Kotal became the first player scout in 1946 when he was hired by Dan Reeves of the Los Angeles Rams.

The NFL's competition with the All-America Football Conference (AAFC) in 1947 resulted in a temporary institution of a bonus pick. Under this system, the first overall selection was awarded as a bonus pick by a random draw, while the last place team picked second, and so on. The team that won this draft lottery then forfeited its selection in the final round of the draft. The winner was then also eliminated from the draw in future years. By 1958, all twelve clubs in the league at the time had received a bonus choice and this system was abolished.

Competitive parity did not, however, quickly arrive in the NFL as perennial losers, such as the Eagles and Chicago Cardinals, standings' did not improve until 1947.

In the 1949 NFL draft, George Taliaferro became the first African-American selected when he was chosen in the thirteenth round. He however, chose to sign with an AAFC team. Wally Triplett was chosen in the nineteenth and he would be the first African-American to be selected in the draft and make an NFL team. After the draft and prior to the start of the season, Paul "Tank" Younger was signed by the Los Angeles Rams as a free agent and became the first NFL player from an historically black college. Eddie Robinson, Younger's coach at Grambling, promptly and unequivocally, impressed upon him that the future of the recruitment and drafting of his colleagues at other black colleges lay in the balance based on his success with the Rams.

=== Technology (1960–1979) ===
The 1960 NFL draft marked a turning point in the draft's history because of the pending arrival of the American Football League (AFL), as it became a "high-stakes, competitive affair."

In 1976, former NFL wide receiver Paul Salata first coined the moniker "Mr. Irrelevant" to refer to the last overall player selected in the draft.

=== ESPN and the digital age (1980–2017) ===
In 1980, Chet Simmons, president of the year-old ESPN, asked Pete Rozelle if the fledgling network could broadcast coverage of the draft live on ESPN. Although Rozelle did not believe it would be entertaining television, he agreed. In 1988, the NFL moved the draft from weekdays to the weekend and ESPN's ratings of the coverage improved dramatically.

In 2006, ESPN received competition when the NFL Network, which had launched in October 2003, began to produce its own draft coverage. ESPN pays the NFL a rights fee for the non-exclusive rights to draft coverage, a fee that is included in its overall contract to televise games (ESPN Sunday Night NFL from 1987 to 2005, and Monday Night Football from 2006 to the present).

In 2010, the NFL moved to a three-day draft with the first day encompassing the first round beginning at 8:00 pm EDT Thursday, the second day encompassing the second and third rounds beginning at 7:00 pm EDT Friday, and third day concluding the process with the final four rounds beginning at 11:00 am EDT Saturday.

=== Fox, NFL Network, ESPN, and ABC (2018) ===
In 2018, the draft was first carried on broadcast television. As a prelude to their new Thursday Night Football contract, Fox and NFL Network simulcast the first two nights of the draft, with both nights featuring personnel from both NFL Network and Fox. ESPN continued to produce its own coverage of the draft, with ESPN2 simulcasting days 1 and 2, and ABC simulcasting day 3. NFL Network's main set featured the crew of host Rich Eisen, Daniel Jeremiah, draft expert Mike Mayock, and Stanford head coach David Shaw, with Steve Mariucci, Steve Smith Sr., and Fox NFL lead analyst Troy Aikman joining from an outside set for day 1. Other analysts included: Fox College Football lead analyst Joel Klatt, Charles Davis, and Deion Sanders.

=== NFL Network, ABC, and ESPN (2019–present) ===
The Fox/NFL Network simulcast would only last one year, as ABC picked up the broadcast television rights for all 3 days of the draft in 2019. ABC's coverage would have the College GameDay crew on days 1 and 2, with Good Morning America anchor Robin Roberts, joined by 2018 NFL MVP and Kansas City Chiefs quarterback Patrick Mahomes, and Grammy Award winner Taylor Swift, co-hosting with GameDay host Rece Davis on day 1. Also, on day 1, Swift announced her new single "ME!", featuring Panic! at the Disco's Brendon Urie, being released at midnight ET, with the music video debuting on YouTube at the same time. Day 3 featured the ESPN crew of Trey Wingo, NFL insiders Louis Riddick, and draft experts Todd McShay and Mel Kiper Jr., hosting ABC's coverage, which was a simulcast of ESPN's coverage.

For the 2020 NFL draft, which was supposed to be in Las Vegas but was moved to a virtual format due to the COVID-19 pandemic, NFL Network decided to simulcast ESPN's coverage of all 3 days. Personalities from NFL Network like: draft guru Daniel Jeremiah, Hall of Fame QB Kurt Warner, and Hall of Fame WR Michael Irvin joined ESPN personnel on all 3 days. ABC continued to carry a feed with the College GameDay crew for the first two days of the draft. Majority of the analysts joined remotely from their homes with Trey Wingo, Rece Davis, Jesse Palmer, and Maria Taylor working from ESPN's Bristol, CT studios. Todd McShay was to also participate in the draft, but was unable to due to him testing positive for COVID.

2021 saw a return to normal as after a one-year hiatus, NFL Network returned to producing their own coverage of the draft. ESPN and ABC continued to carry separate feeds, one with all the "X's and O's" on ESPN, and the other with the College GameDay crew on ABC. After Wingo left ESPN in 2020, Mike Greenberg, host of Get Up!, took over as ESPN's host for the first two nights, while Davis, who continued as ABC's host, hosted ESPN's coverage of Day 3, which was also simulcast on ABC.

2022 saw the draft head to Las Vegas after a two-year wait. NFL Network saw no personnel changes, but ESPN and ABC took a few hits. ESPN announced that insider Adam Schefter would miss the draft to attend his son's college graduation, and Mel Kiper Jr. would participate virtually because of his COVID-19 vaccination status. Kirk Herbstreit meanwhile, announced himself that he would be dropping out of ABC's draft coverage due to blood clots.

== Current format ==
Players who have been out of high school for at least three years are eligible for the NFL draft. The rules do not state that a player must attend college, but virtually all of the players selected in the NFL draft have played college football, usually in the United States but occasionally from Canadian universities as well. A few players are occasionally selected from other football leagues like the Arena Football League (AFL), the Canadian Football League (CFL), and the German Football League (GFL). A small handful of players have also been drafted from colleges who played sports other than football.

Rules state only that a player must be three years removed from high school graduation, regardless of what the prospective draftee did during that time. A year as a redshirt player in college counts toward eligibility even though the player was not allowed to participate in games during that year, therefore players who have completed their redshirt sophomore year can enter the NFL draft.

=== Rules for determining draft order ===
The selection order is based on each team's win–loss record in the previous season and whether the team reached the playoffs. Teams that did not reach the playoffs the previous season are ranked in reverse order of their records (thus the team with the fewest wins is awarded the first selection). Ties between teams with identical records are determined by the following tiebreakers (in order):

1. Strength of schedule, which is the combined win–loss record for all 17 of the team's opponents in the previous season (ties count as half a win and half a loss). The team with the lower strength of schedule (i.e. their opponents compiled fewer wins) is granted the earlier pick in round one. (Each game against a division rival is counted separately, so divisional records are weighted double.)
2. If any teams are in the same division, the other playoff tiebreakers will be applied in the specified order.
3. If any teams are in the same conference, the other playoff tiebreakers will be applied in the specified order.
4. If two teams remain from opposing conferences, a series of tiebreakers starting with head-to-head (if one team lost to the other in the previous regular season), win percentage of common games, and strength of victory are applied. Prior to the 2020 NFL draft, interconference ties were only broken by a coin flip.

Teams that reached the playoffs the previous season are then slotted in the order in which they were eliminated as indicated in the table below. Within each tier, the slotting is determined as above (i.e. worst record picks first and the same tiebreakers apply).

Status	Draft picks
Non-playoff teams	1–18
Eliminated in wild card round	19–24
Eliminated in divisional round	25–28
Conference runners-up	29–30
Super Bowl runner-up	31
Super Bowl champion	32

Once the order for the first round is determined as described above, the selection order remains the same for subsequent rounds with the exception of teams with identical records within their tier. These tied teams "cycle" picks in each subsequent round. For example, in the 2014 draft, the Jacksonville Jaguars, Cleveland Browns, Oakland Raiders, Atlanta Falcons, and Tampa Bay Buccaneers all finished 4–12, and selected in that order in the first round (based on the tiebreakers described above). In the second round, Jacksonville cycled to the back of the line with the order becoming Cleveland, Oakland, Atlanta, Tampa Bay, and Jacksonville. That cycling continued in each round.

An exception to this ordering strategy occurs when "expansion teams" are added to the league. Any expansion team is automatically granted the first selection; if there are two or more expansion teams added, a coin toss (for two expansion teams) or a drawing of lots (for three expansion teams or more) determines which team is awarded the first selection in the regular draft. The winner of the coin toss (or of the drawing of lots in the event there are three or more expansion teams) is awarded the first selection in the expansion draft. Similarly, the order of compensatory picks generally does not follow the standard draft order.

==== Timing ====
Each team has its representatives attend the draft. During the draft, one team is always "on the clock." Teams have eight minutes to make their choice in the first round, seven minutes in the second round, five minutes in the third through sixth rounds, and four minutes in the seventh round. Until 2007, the limits were 15 minutes in the first round, 10 minutes in the second, and 5 minutes for all subsequent rounds. The time for first-round selections was shortened to 10 minutes starting in 2008, and further shortened to 8 minutes starting in 2026. The time for seventh-round selections was shortened from five to four minutes in 2015. If a team does not make a decision within its allotted time, the team still can submit its selection at any time after its time is up, but the next team is then free to make a selection, thus possibly 'stealing' a player the team with the earlier pick may have been considering. This occurred in the 2003 draft, when the Minnesota Vikings, with the 7th overall pick, were late with their selection. The Jacksonville Jaguars drafted quarterback Byron Leftwich and the Carolina Panthers drafted offensive tackle Jordan Gross before the Vikings were able to submit their selection of defensive tackle Kevin Williams. This also happened in 2011; as the Baltimore Ravens were negotiating a trade with the Chicago Bears, their time expired and allowed the Kansas City Chiefs to pick ahead of Baltimore, who were unable to finalize the trade with Chicago.

=== Pick trades ===
Teams may negotiate with one another both before and during the draft (including when they are not "on the clock") for the right to pick an additional player in a given round. For example, a team may include draft picks in future drafts in order to acquire a player during a trading period. Teams may also make negotiations during the draft relinquishing the right to pick in a given round for the right to have an additional pick in a later round. Thus teams may have multiple picks or no picks in a given round. Teams are only allowed to trade picks for the next three draft cycles and picks for the subsequent draft cycle become eligible for trading upon the start of the upcoming draft. For example, for the 2022 draft, only picks through the 2024 draft can be traded prior to the draft, and once the 2022 draft starts, picks from the 2025 draft are eligible to be traded.

=== Compensatory picks ===
In addition to the 32 selections in each of the seven rounds, a total of 32 compensatory selections are awarded to teams based on the players they lost and gained in free agency. The league defines a class of unrestricted free agents as "compensatory free agents" (CFA). Teams that have lost more compensatory free agents than they signed in the previous year receive between one and four selections somewhere in the third through seventh rounds, but always at the end of each round. Teams that gain and lose equal numbers of players but lose higher-valued players can also be awarded a single seventh-round pick. Compensatory selections are awarded each year at the NFL annual meeting which is held at the end of March; typically, about three or four weeks before the draft. Compensatory selections can be traded; this began with the 2017 NFL draft.

The placement of selections is determined by a proprietary formula based on the player's average annual salary, playing time, and postseason honors with his new team, with salary being the primary factor. So, for example, a team that lost a linebacker who signed for $2.5 million per year in free agency might get a sixth-round compensatory pick, while a team that lost a wide receiver who signed for $5 million per year might receive a fourth-round pick. The formula used prior to the 2020 free agency season was never revealed by the NFL, though observers from outside the NFL were able to reverse engineer it to some degree of certainty. The 2020 CBA explicitly provided the details of a new formula, still based primarily on salary.

On two occasions, 33 compensatory selections have been awarded instead of 32:

- In 2016, the additional pick was awarded (under an agreement between the NFL Management Council and the NFLPA) to the Buffalo Bills for losing Da'Norris Searcy to free agency and signing Charles Clay as a transition tagged player from the Miami Dolphins, who had not qualified as a CFA.
- In 2021, the NFL announced compensatory selections — the first under a new formula — on March 10. On March 19, it published a revised list after "a correction by the Management Council to the calculation of average yearly compensation." The revised calculation meant that Damiere Byrd did not qualify as a CFA, giving the New England Patriots an additional fifth-round compensatory pick for Jamie Collins. Rather than remove the last compensatory pick (a sixth-round pick for the Chicago Bears), a 33rd pick was awarded.

If fewer than 32 compensatory selections are awarded, the remainder are awarded after the final Round 7 compensatory selections in the order in which teams would pick in a hypothetical eighth round of the draft; these are known as "supplemental compensatory selections".

=== Resolution JC-2A ===
Resolution JC-2A, which was enacted by the NFL in November 2020, rewards teams for developing minority candidates for head coach and/or general manager positions. The resolution rewards teams whose minority candidates are hired away for one of those positions by awarding draft picks:

- Two draft picks are awarded if a team has one qualified candidate hired for either a coach or a general manager position.
- Three draft picks are awarded if a team has two qualified candidates hired for both positions, whether by the same team or two different teams.
- These draft picks are at the end of the third round in consecutive years, after standard compensatory picks. For example, the first team to receive such picks, the Los Angeles Rams, received picks in 2021 and 2022 after the Detroit Lions hired their director of college scouting, Brad Holmes, as their general manager.
- if multiple teams qualify in a given year, they are awarded in draft order from the first round. The number of picks awarded via the resolution has no impact on the 32 compensatory picks described above.

The resolution followed moves strengthening the league's Rooney Rule to require two minority candidates be interviewed for head coach positions (previously one), and one minority candidate for open coordinator positions (previously not required). It also replaced an earlier resolution that would have rewarded teams for hiring minority candidates rather than for developing them.

=== Salaries ===
The NFL allows each team a certain amount of money from its salary cap to sign its drafted rookies for their first season. That amount is based on an undisclosed formula that assigns a certain value to each pick in the draft; thus, having more picks, or earlier picks, will increase the allotment. In 2008 the highest allotment was about $8.22 million for the Kansas City Chiefs, who had 12 picks, including two first-rounders, while the lowest was the $1.79 million for the Cleveland Browns who had only five picks, and none in the first three rounds. The exact mechanism for the rookie salary cap is set out in the NFL's collective bargaining agreement (CBA) with the National Football League Players Association (NFLPA). (Those numbers represent the cap hits that each rookie's salary may contribute, not the total amount of money paid out.)

The drafted players are paid salaries commensurate with the position in which they were drafted. High first-round picks get paid the most, and low-round picks get paid the least. There is a de facto pay scale for drafted rookies. After the draft, non-drafted rookies may sign a contract with any team in the league. These rookie free-agents are not usually paid as well as drafted players, nearly all of them signing for the predetermined rookie minimum and a small signing bonus.

Two other facets of the rookie salary cap affect the makeup of rosters. First, the base salaries of rookie free agents do not count towards the rookie salary cap, though certain bonuses do. Second, if a rookie is traded, his cap allotment remains with the team that originally drafted him, which make trades involving rookie players relatively rare. (This rule does not apply, however, to rookies that are waived by the teams that drafted them.)

Teams used to be able to agree to a contract with a draft-eligible player before the draft itself starts. They could only do this if they have the first overall pick, as by agreeing to terms with a player the team has already "selected" which player they will draft. The last example of this was quarterback Matthew Stafford and the Detroit Lions in the 2009 NFL draft: the Lions picked Stafford with the first overall selection in the draft, and had agreed to a six-year, $78 million deal ($41.7 million guaranteed) with Stafford a day before the draft officially started.

Since 2011, all rookies that are drafted, even those drafted first overall, now have their compensation and duration predetermined each year before the draft occurs, and can no longer negotiate beforehand.

=== Forfeiture ===
The NFL commissioner has the authority to forfeit picks any team is allotted in a draft for rules violations. A total of 28 selections have been forfeited since 1980 for 23 rules violations by 15 teams, while three other selections have been moved down from their original position. The New England Patriots have been the most penalized team, losing five draft picks for four violations. The Denver Broncos, Las Vegas Raiders (as the Oakland Raiders), New Orleans Saints and San Francisco 49ers have each committed two violations. The Pittsburgh Steelers, who have forfeited only one pick since 1980 (a third rounder in 2001 due to trying to circumvent the salary cap involving offensive lineman Will Wolford in 1998), have also forfeited multiple picks, with the other one coming in the form of a third-rounder in 1979 for the 1978 Shouldergate controversy. Teams selecting a player in a supplemental draft will forfeit the corresponding selection in the following year's NFL draft.

Draft	Team	Pick(s)	Reason
1980	Philadelphia Eagles	3rd	Holding an illegal tryout
1980	Oakland Raiders	4th	Exceeding player limit
1981	Denver Broncos	3rd	Contract violations involving DB Bill Thompson
1981	Oakland Raiders	5th	Illegally sequestering players in 1978
1986	New England Patriots	3rd	Illegal use of injured-reserve list
1995	Carolina Panthers	2nd	Tampering with DC Dom Capers, who was under contract with the Pittsburgh Steelers, about the Panthers' head coaching job
1995	Carolina Panthers	6th	Tampering with DC Dom Capers, who was under contract with the Pittsburgh Steelers, about the Panthers' head coaching job
2001	Pittsburgh Steelers	3rd	Exceeding the salary cap in 1998
2001	San Francisco 49ers	5th	Violations of salary cap rules
2002	San Francisco 49ers	3rd	Violations of salary cap rules
2002	Denver Broncos	3rd	Violations of the salary cap in 1996–1998
2005	Denver Broncos	3rd	Violations of the salary cap in 1996–1998
2008	New England Patriots	1st	Illegally videotaping New York Jets coaches' signals on the sideline during a 2007 game
2008	San Francisco 49ers	5th (Note: In addition to forfeiting their 5th round selection, the 49ers were required to swap 3rd-round selections with the Bears (moving the 49ers down and the Bears up six spots).)	Tampering with LB Lance Briggs, who was under contract with the Chicago Bears
2012	New Orleans Saints	2nd	Paying "bounties" for injuring opposing players
2012	Detroit Lions	6th (Note: In addition to forfeiting their 6th round selection, the Lions were required to swap 2011 5th-round selections with the Chiefs (moving the Lions down and the Chiefs up 14 spots).)	Tampering with S Jarrad Page, who was under contract with the Kansas City Chiefs
2013	New Orleans Saints	2nd	Paying "bounties" for injuring opposing players
2016	New England Patriots	1st	Deflating footballs used in the 2014 AFC Championship Game
2016	Kansas City Chiefs	3rd	Violations of the NFL's anti-tampering policy during the 2015 free agency period
2016	Atlanta Falcons	5th	Pumping artificial noise into their stadium
2017	New England Patriots	4th	Deflating footballs used in the 2014 AFC Championship Game
2017	Seattle Seahawks	5th	Violation of off-season workout policies
2017	Kansas City Chiefs	6th	Violation of the NFL's anti-tampering policy during the 2015 free agency period
2021	New England Patriots	3rd	Illegally filming the field and sidelines during a Cincinnati–Cleveland game in December 2019 (by the team's television crew)
2021	Minnesota Vikings	7th	Violation of salary cap rules in 2019 regarding a practice squad player
2022	New Orleans Saints	6th	Repeated violations of COVID-19 protocols during the 2020 season
2023	Miami Dolphins	1st	Punishment for multiple violations of the league's anti-tampering policy in conversations with quarterback Tom Brady and Don Yee, the agent for then-New Orleans Saints coach Sean Payton (as well as Brady)
2023	Houston Texans	5th	Salary cap reporting violation by providing then-Texan Deshaun Watson with undisclosed compensation
2024	Miami Dolphins	3rd	Forfeited with their 2023 pick forfeiture.
2025	San Francisco 49ers	5th	Punishment for administrative payroll accounting errors that occurred during the 2022 season
2025	Atlanta Falcons	5th	Violation of the league's anti-tampering policy by having "improper contact" with QB Kirk Cousins, WR Darnell Mooney and TE Charlie Woerner

=== Team policies ===
Teams vary greatly in their selection methodologies. Owners, general managers, coaches, and others may or may not participate. For example, in the 1983 draft, Pittsburgh Steelers' head coach Chuck Noll had what team executive Art Rooney, Jr. later described as "the final say" over picks, even over his father, team owner Art Rooney. This led to the team drafting Gabriel Rivera over Rooney's favorite, local product and Oakland (Pittsburgh) native Dan Marino. Rivera only played six games before becoming paralyzed in a drunk-driving crash. Terry Bradshaw's sudden retirement the following year and Marino's eventual Hall of Fame career with the Dolphins led to the elder Rooney reminding his sons daily until his death in 1988 that the team "should've drafted Marino".

New England Patriots head coach Ron Meyer, by contrast, later stated that the team, led by owner Billy Sullivan, excluded the coaching staff from any personnel-related decisions, even prohibiting him from reading scouting reports. Meyer claimed that had he possessed the decision-making authority, he would not have chosen Tony Eason in the first round of the 1983 draft.

=== Festivities and attendance ===
The draft was first televised in 1980 by ESPN. It would subsequently develop into a major U.S. television event. Despite attaining a sizable television audience, through the 2014 edition its in-person attendance remained limited. Between 1965 and 2014, the draft was held entirely in venues within New York City. However, the NFL grew frustrated with its longtime host venue, Radio City Music Hall, when the 2014 draft needed to be scheduled later than planned in the year due to a scheduling conflict at the venue; this prompted the league to open bidding for a new site to host its 2015 draft. NFL Commissioner Roger Goodell selected the city of Chicago over Los Angeles. To host the 2015 event, Chicago reimagined the draft into a much larger event than it previously had been, making the event accessible to large public attendance. While the first three rounds of the draft itself still took place inside an indoor venue (the Auditorium Theatre), across the street from the theater in Grant Park Chicago erected a large free-admission multi-day fan festival dubbed "Draft Town" that drew 200,000 visitors. Within the grounds of the festival, fans could watch live footage of the first three rounds draft from within the festival, and the final round of the draft was held in an area of the festival dubbed "Selection Square". The NFL has retained the large-scale attendance and festivities pioneered when Chicago hosted. The 2026 draft in Pittsburgh set the all-time attendance record with more than 800,000.

== Events leading up to the draft ==
=== NFL Draft Advisory Board decisions ===
College football players who are considering entering the NFL draft but who still have eligibility to play football can request an expert opinion from the NFL-created Draft Advisory Board. The Board, composed of scouting experts and team executives, makes a prediction as to the likely round in which a player would be drafted. This information, which has proven to be fairly accurate, can help college players determine whether to enter the draft or to continue playing and improving at the college level. There are also many famous reporting scouts, such as Mel Kiper Jr.

=== NFL Scouting Combine ===
The NFL Scouting Combine is a six-day assessment of skills occurring every year in late February or early March in Lucas Oil Stadium in Indianapolis, Indiana. College football players perform physical and mental tests in front of NFL coaches, general managers, and scouts. With increasing interest in the NFL draft, the scouting combine has grown in scope and significance, allowing personnel directors to evaluate upcoming prospects in a standardized setting. Its origins have evolved from the National, BLESTO, and Quadra Scouting services in 1977 to the media frenzy it has become today. Athletes attend by invitation only. Implications of one's performance during the Combine can affect perception, draft status, salary, and ultimately his career. The draft has popularized the term "Workout Warrior" (sometimes known as a "Workout Wonder"), describing an athlete who, based on superior measurables such as size, speed, and strength, has increased his "draft stock" despite having a possibly average or subpar college career.

=== Pro Day ===
Many universities host a Pro Day, during which the NCAA allows NFL scouts to visit the school and watch players participate in NFL Scouting Combine-like events and drills. Some smaller universities join with nearby schools. They are essentially job fairs for prospective NFL players.

=== Pre-draft visits ===
Each NFL team is allowed to transport a maximum of 30 draft-eligible players for the purposes of physical examinations, interviews, and written tests. If a player attends a school or grew up in the same "metropolitan area" as the team that is inviting the player, that visit is not counted towards the 30-player limit.

=== All-Star games and events ===
Up until the 2023 season only Seniors or graduate students could participate in the all-star games, but for the 2024 NFL draft the league eased its rules to allow juniors to participate in three college football postseason all-star games: the Senior Bowl, East–West Shrine Bowl and the HBCU Legacy Bowl, while all other all-star games will not be allowed to invite underclassmen.

==== Senior Bowl ====
The Senior Bowl takes place 3–4 weeks after the NCAA Division I Football Championship in Mobile, Alabama. The purpose of this game is for college football players to show off their skills for NFL scouts. Kevin Faulk, Von Miller, Dak Prescott, Phillip Rivers, and Patrick Willis were some of the players who had successful NFL careers after playing in the Senior Bowl.

==== East-West Shrine Bowl ====
Started in 1925, the East-West Shrine Bowl is the oldest running college all-star game. The game is played by college players who plan on joining the NFL draft. The East-West Shrine Bowl gives coaches and players an opportunity to show off their abilities and learn from NFL coaches and players, and also raises money for Shriners Hospitals for Children. Popular East-West Shrine Bowl alumni include Tom Brady, John Elway, and Brett Favre.

==== HBCU Legacy Bowl ====
Started at 2022, it is intended for NFL draft-eligible players from historically black colleges and universities (HBCU). The game is played at Yulman Stadium in New Orleans, Louisiana and it is usually the last all-star game in the draft cycle. It also hosts the NFL's HBCU Combine, which was previously held at the Senior Bowl.

==== Hula Bowl ====
A Hawaii based post-season college football all-star game held annually, usually in January, with the purpose that players to show off their skills for NFL scouts. Some popular Hula Bowl alumni are Mike Ditka, Larry Csonka, Jack Ham and Dan Marino.

==== Tropical Bowl ====
Held since 2016 in Florida, with over 350 alumni playing in the NFL.

==== College Gridiron Showcase ====
An independently operated annual post-season college football event held since 2015 in Texas for small college players from FCS, NCAA Division II, NCAA Division III, and the NAIA. and select players from around the world, designed to get these players in front of NFL teams and other professional leagues. The event originated as a post-season all star game in 2015, but switched to its current drill showcase and "controlled scrimmage" format in 2016. In addition to on-field drills, the event also features educational seminars to educates players on the business side of an pro career.

==== Other smaller events ====
Some of the smaller post-season college football all-star games which are held annually are:

- FCS Bowl and National Bowl Game - Two independently operated annual post-season college football all-star games, played each December in Florida since 2014. The games are open exclusively to NFL draft prospects from FCS and lower divisions (respectively) with both played as a doubleheader.
- Dream Bowl - Held since 2013, is an independent All-Star Showcase for players from the FCS and lower divisions, that sent multiple players to pro leagues. The game is always held on Martin Luther King Jr. Day weekend to celebrate his legacy and to follow after this iconic "I Have a Dream" speech. The event was first held in Roanoke, Virginia but since moved to the Dallas–Fort Worth metroplex in Texas. Between 2017 and 2022 it ran a separate event called HBCU Spirit of America Bowl which featured Historically Black Colleges and Universities players and was played a day before the "Dream Bowl".
- HBCU Pigskin Showdown - A HBCU dedicated all-star game which is played each December in Selma, Alabama since 2021.

==== Past major events ====
- Chicago College All-Star Game - The game was played from 1934 to 1976 (except for 1974, due to that year's NFL strike) at Soldier Field between the NFL champions and a team of star college seniors from the previous year, and was run by Chicago Tribune. The game was the prominent college all-star game while played. In the 42 College All-Star Games, the defending pro champions won 31, the All-Stars won nine, and two were ties, giving the collegians a .238 winning percentage. The 1976 College All-Star Game remains the last time an NFL team has played any team from outside the league.
- Blue–Gray Football Classic - Annual college football all-star game held in Montgomery, Alabama from 1939 to 2003, usually in late December and often on Christmas Day. The format pitted players who attended college in the states of the former Confederacy, the "Grays", who wore white jerseys, against players who attended school in the northern half of the country, the "Blues", who wore blue jerseys, and also sometimes including players from western teams. Both teams wore gray pants. It was the first game who paid players for their participation.
- North–South Shrine Game - Annual postseason college football all-star game played each December from 1948 to 1973 in Miami, Florida, with a final game in 1976 in Pontiac, Michigan. The game was sponsored by the fraternal group Shriners International, with proceeds used to support the Shriners Hospitals for Crippled Children, and was similar game to the East–West Shrine Game, which still active and has been played since 1925.
- Japan Bowl - All-star game played in Japan each January from 1976 to 1993, which showcased East and West all-star teams made up of college football players from the United States. The bowl featured various famous participants, including Heisman Trophy winners Bo Jackson and Ty Detmer, who both received MVP awards.
- NFLPA Collegiate Bowl - The event was founded in 2012 by the National Football League Players Association (NFLPA) as a post-season college football all-star game for NFL draft-eligible college players. Players predominantly, but not exclusively, were from teams within the Football Bowl Subdivision (FBS) and the Football Championship Subdivision (FCS). Starting with the 2018 edition, the game was held at the Rose Bowl in Pasadena, California. The event was established in part to prepare draft-eligible college football players for a career in the NFL. During the week preceding the game, the NFLPA provided an introduction to the players union and educates players on the business side of an NFL career. Current and former NFL players were invited to attend the week's events to share their NFL experiences with the draft eligible players. In 2023 the NFLPA decided to cancel the game after 12 years.

== Tickets ==
Tickets to the NFL draft are free and made available to fans on a first-come first-served basis. The tickets are distributed at the box office the morning of the draft, one ticket per person.

== Host venues ==
From the mid-1930s to the mid-1960s, the draft was held in various Northeastern, Midwestern, Mid-Atlantic, and Western cities with NFL franchises.

Between 1965 and 2014, the NFL held the draft at various venues in New York City. The Theater at Madison Square Garden hosted the event for a ten-year period from 1995 to 2004, before it was moved to Javits Convention Center in 2005 following a dispute with the Cablevision-owned arena, who were opposing the West Side Stadium, which would have served as home of the New York Jets and the centerpiece of the New York City bid for the 2012 Summer Olympics, because the new stadium would have competed with the Garden for concerts and other events. The draft was then held at Radio City Music Hall from 2006 to 2014.

Starting in 2015, the league opened the draft location to a bidding process. Chicago won the bidding in both 2015 and 2016, hosting the draft for the first time since 1964. These drafts marked the transformation of the draft into an event featuring festivities and attendance by large public crowds. After these drafts in Chicago, the NFL has held the draft in different cities each year.

The 2020 draft, originally scheduled to be held in Las Vegas, was held virtually due to the COVID–19 pandemic, with teams conducting it via telecommunication.

=== Future venues ===
Future venues are as follows:

- National Mall, Washington, D.C., 2027
- Downtown Minneapolis, Minneapolis, MN, 2028

=== Summary by city ===
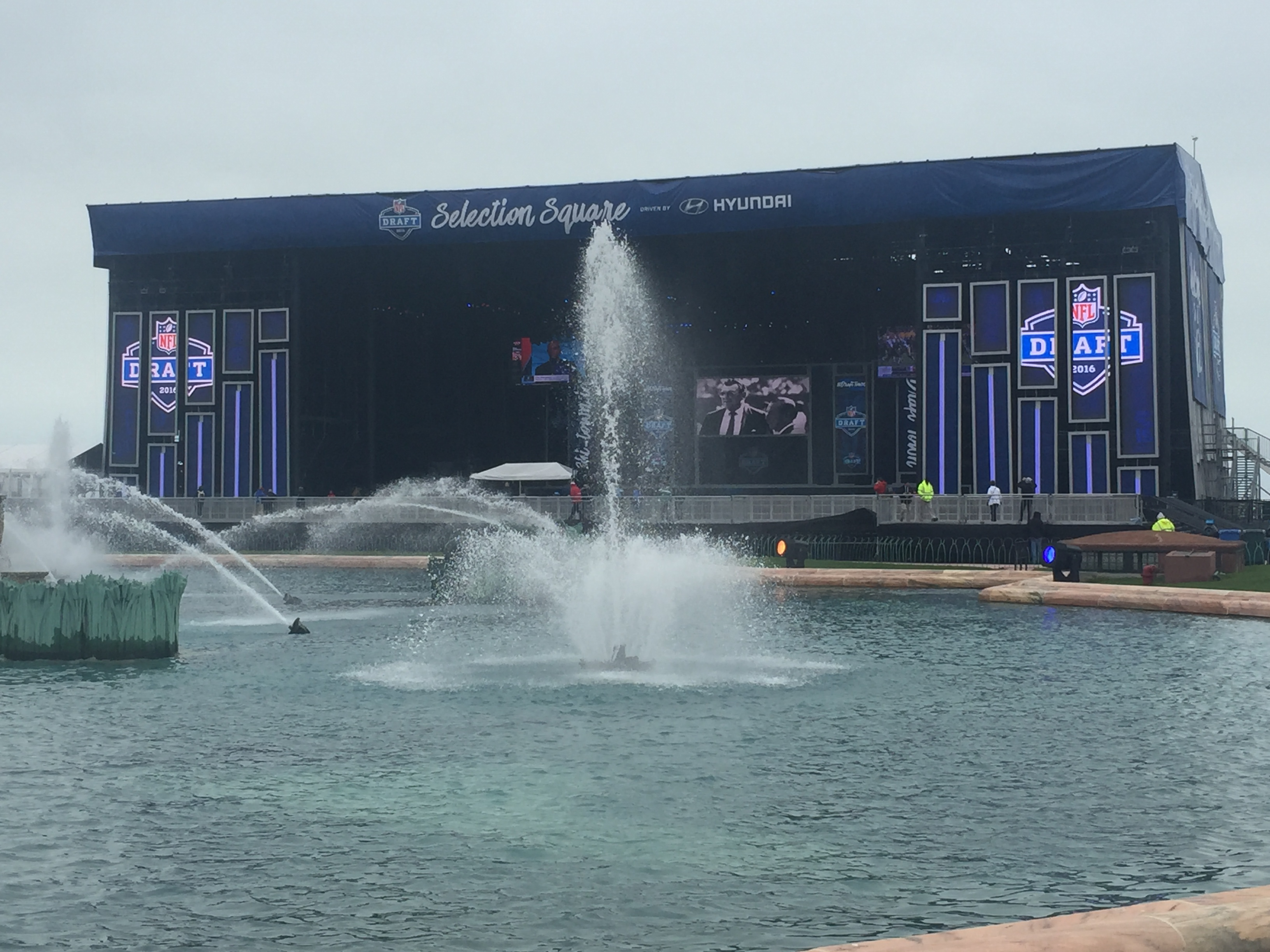
"Selection Square" for the 2016 NFL draft at Grant Park's Buckingham Fountain in Chicago.

Chicago: 1938, 1942–1943, 1951, 1962–1964, 2015–2016 (9)

- Auditorium Theatre and Grant Park: 2015, 2016 (2)
- Blackstone Hotel: 1951 (1)
- InterContinental Chicago Magnificent Mile/Sheraton Hotel & Towers: 1962, 1963, 1964 (3)
- Palmer House Hotel: 1942, 1943 (2)
- Sherman House Hotel: 1938 (1)

Cleveland: 2021 (1)

- FirstEnergy Stadium: 2021 (1)

Dallas: 2018 (1)

- AT&T Stadium (Arlington, Texas): 2018 (1)

Detroit: 2024 (1)

- Downtown Detroit: Hart Plaza and Campus Martius Park: 2024 (1)

Green Bay: 2025 (1)

- Lambeau Field: 2025 (1)

Kansas City: 2023 (1)

- Union Station: 2023 (1)

Las Vegas: 2022 (1)

- Bellagio (Paradise, Nevada): 2022 (1)

Los Angeles: 1956 (1)

- Ambassador Hotel: 1956* (1)

Milwaukee: 1940 (1)

- Schroeder Hotel: 1940 (1)

Minneapolis: 2028 (1)

- Downtown Minneapolis: 2028 (1)

Nashville: 2019 (1)

- Lower Broadway: 2019

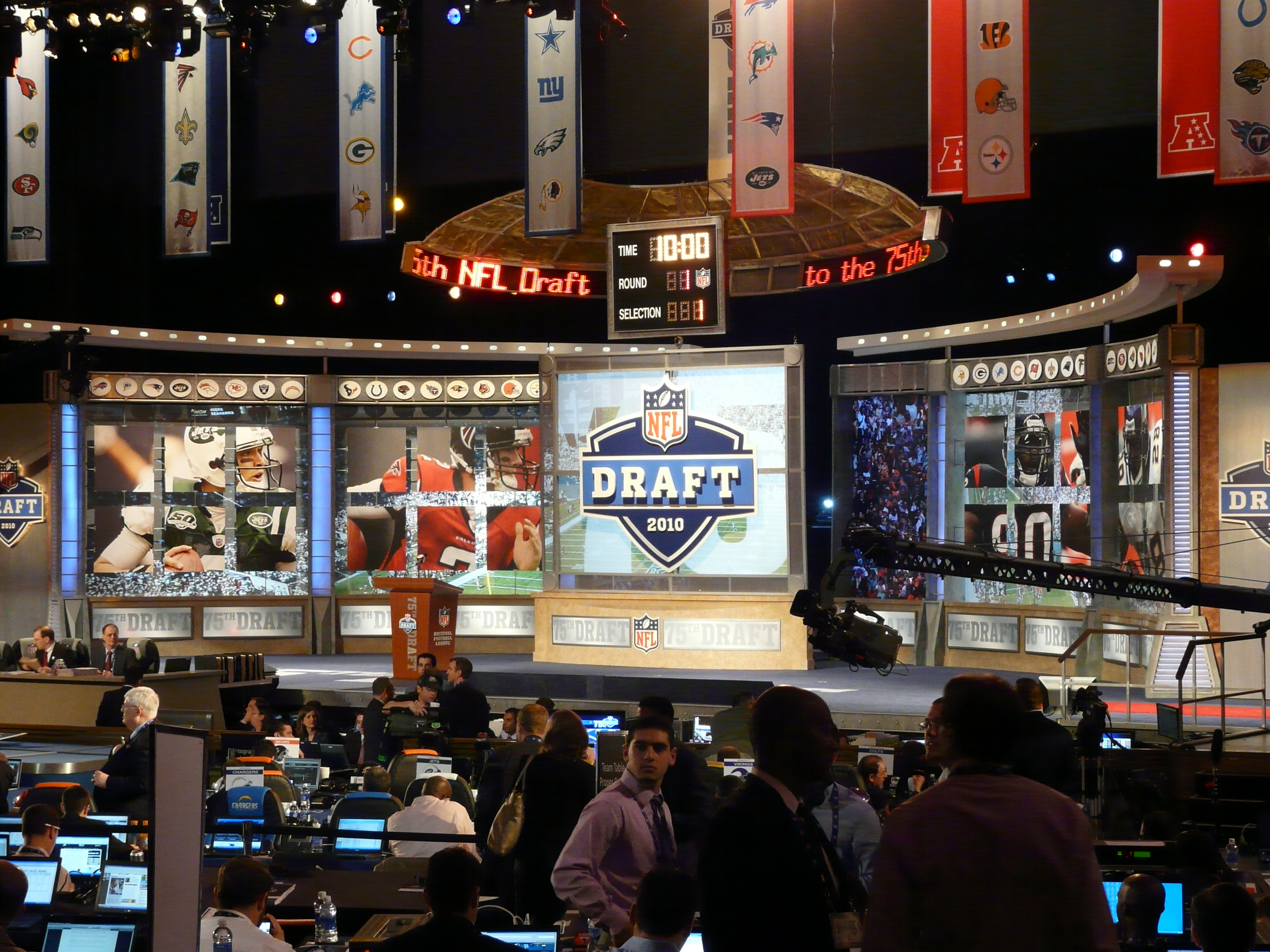
The set for the 2010 NFL draft at Radio City Music Hall in New York City

New York City: 1937, 1939, 1945–1947, 1952, 1955, 1965–2014 (57)

- Americana Hotel: 1973, 1974 (2)
- Belmont Plaza Hotel: 1968, 1969, 1970, 1971 (4)
- Essex House: 1972 (1)
- Gotham Hotel: 1967 (1)
- Hilton at Rockefeller Center: 1975 (1)
- Commodore Hotel: 1945, 1946, 1947 (3)
- Hotel Lincoln: 1937 (1)
- Hotel Statler: 1952 (1)
- Javits Center: 2005 (1)
- New York Marriott Marquis: 1986, 1987, 1988, 1989, 1990, 1991, 1992, 1993, 1994 (9)
- New York Sheraton Hotel/Omni Park Central Hotel: 1980, 1981, 1982, 1983, 1984, 1985 (6)
- New Yorker Hotel: 1939 (1)
- Radio City Music Hall: 2006, 2007, 2008, 2009, 2010, 2011, 2012, 2013, 2014 (9)
- Roosevelt Hotel: 1976, 1977, 1978 (3)
- Summit Hotel: 1965, 1966 (2)
- Theater at Madison Square Garden: 1995, 1996, 1997, 1998, 1999, 2000, 2001, 2002, 2003, 2004 (10)
- Waldorf-Astoria Hotel: 1979 (1)
- Warwick Hotel: 1955 (1)

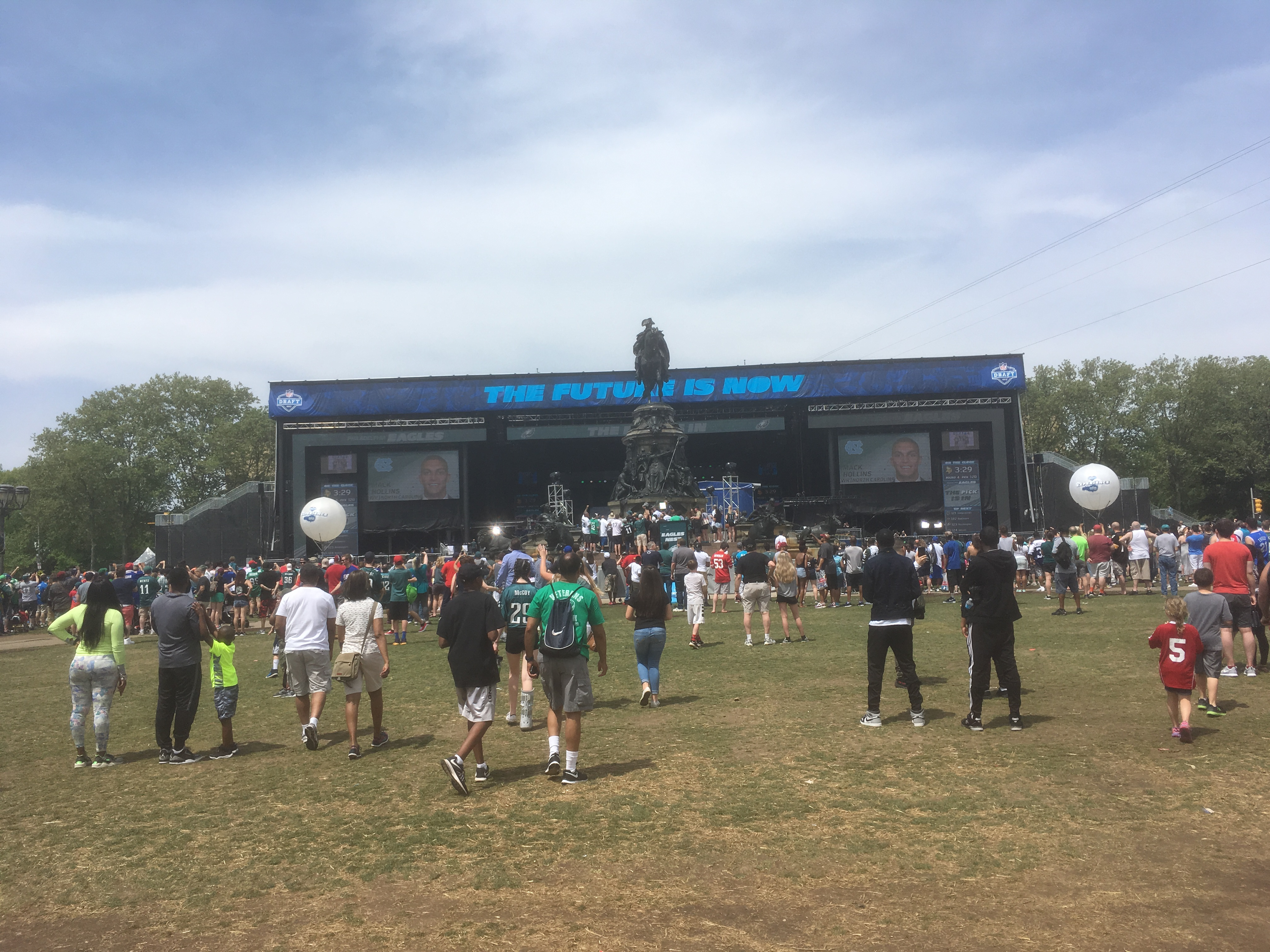
The stage for the 2017 NFL draft on Eakins Oval in front of the Philadelphia Museum of Art

Philadelphia: 1936, 1944, 1949–1961, 2017 (15)

- Bellevue-Stratford Hotel: 1949*, 1950, 1953, 1954, 1955, 1956*, 1957* (8)
- Eakins Oval: 2017 (1)
- Racquet Club of Philadelphia: 1950* (1)
- Ritz-Carlton Hotel: 1936 (1)
- Warwick Hotel: 1944, 1957*, 1958, 1959, 1960, 1961 (6)

Pittsburgh: 1948–1949, 2026 (3)

- Fort Pitt Hotel: 1948 (1)
- Schenley Hotel: 1949* (1)
- Acrisure Stadium: 2026 (1)

Washington, D.C.: 1941, 2027 (2)

- Willard Hotel: 1941 (1)
- National Mall: 2027 (1)

*: Year with more than one draft venue

=== AFL draft venues ===
Before the NFL-AFL merger, the American Football League (AFL) held its own draft in several locations.

Dallas: 1961–1963 (3)

- Dallas Statler Hilton (1961–1963)

Minneapolis: 1960 (1)

- Nicollet Hotel (1960)

New York: 1964–1966 (3)

- Waldorf Astoria (1964–1966*)

No location (by telephone): 1965* (1)

*: Year with more than one draft venue

Source: NFL Draft Locations

== Supplemental draft ==
Since 1977, the NFL has also held a supplemental draft to accommodate players who did not enter the regular draft. Players generally enter the supplementary draft because they missed the filing deadline for the NFL draft or because issues developed which affected their eligibility (such as academic or disciplinary matters). The supplemental draft is scheduled to occur at some point after the regular draft and before the start of the next season. In 1984, the NFL held a supplemental draft for players who were under contract with USFL and CFL teams.

Draft order is determined by a weighted system that is divided into three groupings. First come the teams that had six or fewer wins last season, followed by non-playoff teams that had more than six wins, followed by the 12 (now 14) playoff teams. In the supplemental draft, a team is not required to use any picks. Instead, if a team wants a player in the supplemental draft, they submit a "bid" to the Commissioner with the round they would pick that player. If no other team places a bid on that player at an earlier spot, the team is awarded the player and has to give up an equivalent pick in the following year's draft. (For example, FS Paul Oliver was taken by the San Diego Chargers in the fourth round of the supplemental draft in 2007; thus, in the 2008 NFL draft, the Chargers forfeited a fourth-round pick.)

The 1985 supplemental draft was particularly controversial. Quarterback Bernie Kosar who had led the University of Miami to its first national championship in 1983 was earning his academic degree as a junior. Rather than finish his eligibility at Miami he wanted to turn pro. At this time college players had to wait for their class unless they themselves graduated early.

Football agent AJ Faigin devised a plan to get Kosar to his preferred team, the Cleveland Browns. Faigin was representing former University of Miami QB Jim Kelly, then in the USFL, but whose NFL rights were held by the Buffalo Bills. The USFL was in its last days and Kelly would soon be available to the Bills. Faigin's first step was to ask Bill Polian, the GM of Buffalo, if he would be willing to trade the number one supplemental pick (worth next to nothing at that time) to Cleveland. Polian agreed and Faigin told the Cleveland Browns a trade was available. He next notified Kosar's father he should not formally submit his son's application for the standard NFL draft that was weeks away and declare only afterward; which would put him into the supplemental draft.

The result of Kosar's withdrawal resulted in rare, open warfare among NFL teams played out in the newspapers with threats of lawsuits between them, notably the Minnesota Vikings and New York Giants, who had expressed interest in choosing him in that season's regular draft. But as no rules were broken the Giants and eventually Minnesota had to back down. Following that season, the NFL instituted the current semi-random supplemental draft order.

The strategy devised by A.J. Faigin, to not declare for the NFL until after the regular draft, was subsequently used by other top players for various reasons. In some cases, it was because they did not want to play for the team that would have drafted them in the regular draft. For example, in 1987, Brian Bosworth did not declare because he did not want to play for the Indianapolis Colts or the Buffalo Bills, the teams who drafted second and third that year. The Colts had offered him a 4-year, $2.2 million deal before the draft. The Seattle Seahawks won the right to draft first in the supplemental draft, and later signed him to a 10-year, $11 million contract. At the time that was the largest rookie contract in NFL history.

As of the 1990 season, only players who had graduated or exhausted their college eligibility were made available for the supplemental draft. Since 1993, only players who had planned to attend college but for various reasons could not, have been included in the supplemental draft.

== See also ==
- Draftnik
- List of professional American football drafts
- List of NFL draft broadcasters
- List of first overall NFL draft picks
- List of second overall NFL draft picks
- Mr. Irrelevant
