= FCS Bowl =

FCS College football all-star bowl game

- FCS National Bowl
- Stadium: Municipal Stadium (2016–present)
- Location: Daytona Beach, Florida (2016–present)
- Previous stadiums: Riccardo Silva Stadium (2014–2015)
- Previous locations: Miami, Florida (2014–2015)
- Operated: 2014–present
- Website: fcsbowl.com

Sponsors
- Team No Sleep Sports

2024 matchup
- American vs. National (American 29–0)

2025 matchup
- Postponed

The FCS Bowl, also known as the FCS National Bowl, is an independently operated post-season college football all-star game, normally played annually in December in Florida since 2014. The game showcases NFL draft prospects of those collegiate players who have completed their eligibility in NCAA Division I Football Championship Subdivision (FCS), although the game does feature players from Division II, Division III, and from NAIA as well. The game is played as a doubleheader with the National Bowl Game. The December 2025 edition was postponed "due to unforeseen circumstances."

== History ==
The FCS Bowl was first played in December 2014 at Riccardo Silva Stadium on the campus of Florida International University (FIU). The game was organized by East Preps LLC, who operated the game independently. After two years, the game moved to Municipal Stadium in Daytona Beach, Florida.

The game and an associated scouting combine provide opportunity for players from smaller colleges to get exposure with scouts from various professional leagues, including the NFL and CFL. Additionally, NFL Films distributes game and practice film to NFL teams. Organizers report that 26 players from the December 2015 games (National Bowl Game and FCS Bowl) reached the NFL in some capacity. At the December 2016 game, 14 NFL teams were represented, with over 30 scouts in attendance.

The December 2025 edition was indefinitely postponed four days before its intended playing. As of that planned edition, the bowl was operated by Team No Sleep Sports.

== Game results ==
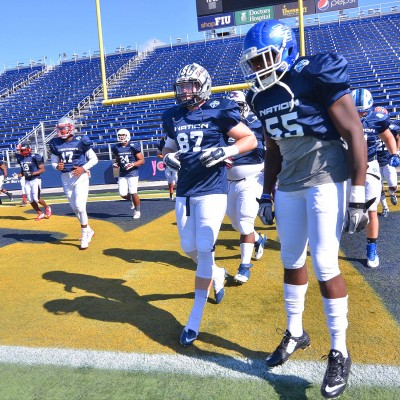
FCS Bowl in Miami

Date	Winning team		Losing team		Stadium	City	Ref.
December 7, 2014	White Team	41	Navy Team	28	Riccardo Silva Stadium	Miami, FL	
December 6, 2015	American	23	National	22	Riccardo Silva Stadium	Miami, FL	
December 4, 2016	American	33	National	16	Municipal Stadium	Daytona Beach, FL	
December 10, 2017	National	19	American	7	Municipal Stadium	Daytona Beach, FL	
December 9, 2018	American	38	National	37	Municipal Stadium	Daytona Beach, FL	
December 10, 2023	National	14	American	12	Municipal Stadium	Daytona Beach, FL	
December 8, 2024	American	29	National	0	Municipal Stadium	Daytona Beach, FL	
December 14, 2025	Postponed				Municipal Stadium	Daytona Beach, FL	

== MVPs ==
Overall MVPs of each game are listed below. Some additional awards not listed are also given, for offensive and defensive player of each team, special teams player, lineman, and the James Pratt Courage Award.

Year	MVP	Pos.	College
2014	Benjamin Anderson	QB	Arkansas–Pine Bluff
2015	Jarrid Williams	LB	Wagner
2016	Josh Straughan	QB	Southern Illinois
2017	Rameses Owens	RB	Lincoln (PA)
2018	Vincent Espinoza	QB	Lincoln (PA)
2023	Raydarius Freeman	DL	UNC Pembroke
2024	Dallaz Corbitt	DE	Bethune-Cookman

== See also ==
- List of college bowl games
