= Mock draft =

Simulated sports draft

Mock draft is a term used by sports websites and magazines in reference to a simulation of a sports league draft or fantasy sports league's draft. ESPN has run mock drafts on the front page of its website, allowing any visitor to vote towards a specific team's choice. Mock drafts are often found to be helpful to fans because they allow them to speculate on which members of the collegiate ranks will join the fan's favorite team.

There are many Internet and television analysts that are considered experts in this field and can give the fans some understanding of where players are expected to go in drafts. Although mock drafts are created for nearly every sport that uses drafts, they are most commonplace for the National Football League. Analysts Mel Kiper Jr., Todd McShay, and Mike Mayock have been considered "experts" on the NFL Draft. Apart from experts, fans also create mock draft with the help of simulators, majorly in NFL and NBA. Using simulators, user behaves like a GM of their team as they can draft players as per actual draft order and the sim/machine chooses players for remaining teams based on an algo that considers factors like team needs, prospect rankings etc.

Some draftniks diligently base evaluations on careful research and tape study. Others blend workout results, regurgitated wisdom, generalities, jargon, rumors, hallucinations and educated guesses into elaborate and seemingly precise scouting reports.

— The New York Times, 2011

Mock drafts, however, do not replicate the real methodology that teams' general managers used to choose players. Internet mock drafts typically rank many dozens of players per position, often with immense detail for each prospect, and some forecast drafts for several years into the future. NFL teams, by contrast, each year often view even likely first round picks as little more than faceless statistics during the NFL Combine in February, do not evaluate so many players (only about one dozen quarterbacks are selected in each draft, for example), and do not complete their detailed evaluations until just before the draft in late April. Draft analysts often claim that a player has "climbed" or "fallen" into another draft round due to various factors, but such statements presuppose—often inaccurately—that teams have already made detailed evaluations of the player and that a consensus exists across the entire league.

== Fantasy sports mock drafts ==
Mock drafts are practice fantasy sports drafts. Before a league's draft takes place, mock drafts are a way to practice before someone's pride and/or money are on the line. Participating in a mock draft alerts fantasy players to real players that are going higher or lower than one expected. Savvy fantasy sports players also monitor the results of these drafts for trends and to see where players are being taken to get a feel for each player's value (as shown in the Average Draft Position (or ADP) from multiple mock drafts).
