= Jon Cornish Trophy =

College football award

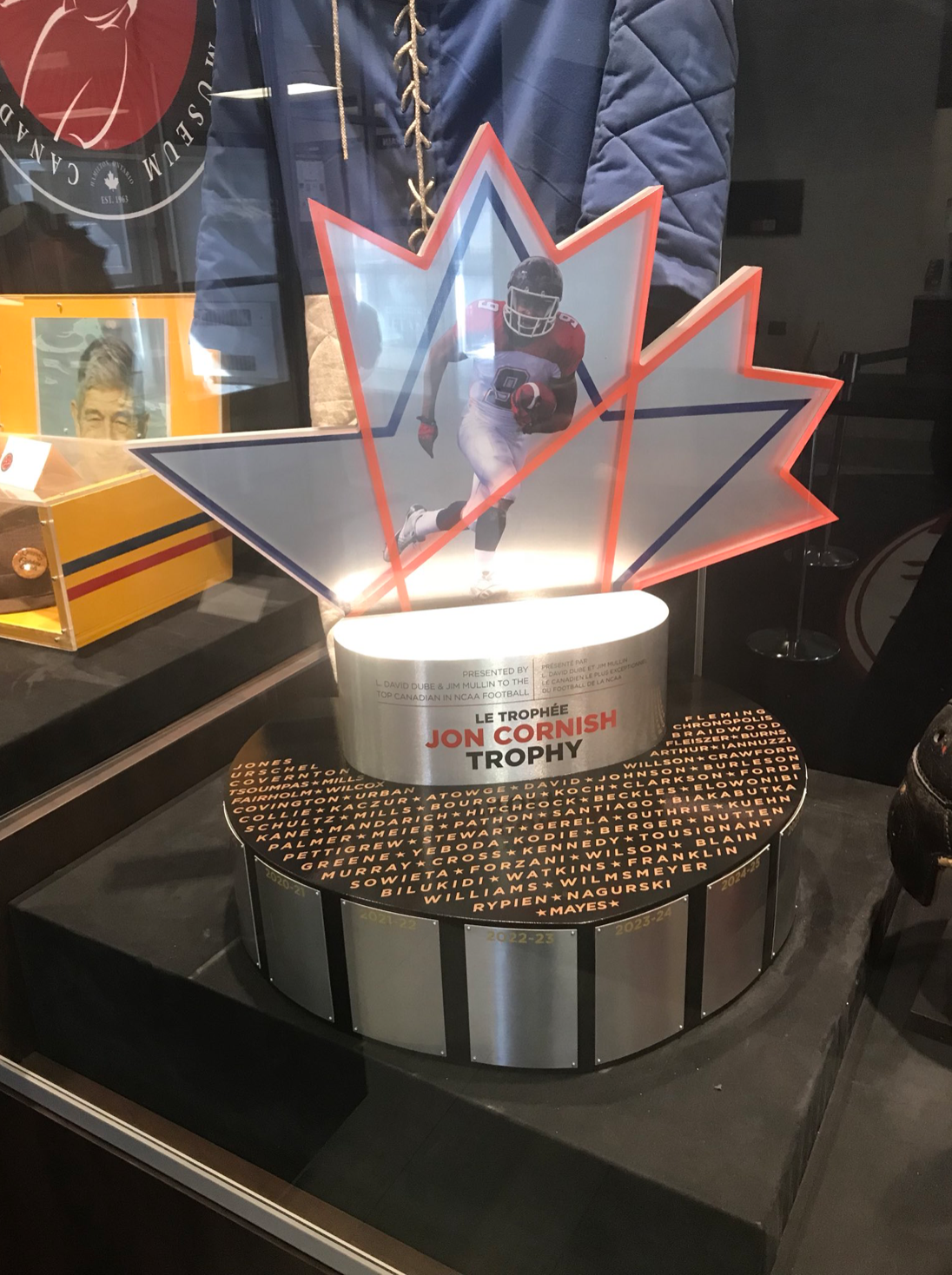
- The trophy on display at the Canadian Football Hall of Fame
- Awarded for: The most outstanding Canadian student athlete in NCAA football
- Location: Canadian Football Hall of Fame (Hamilton, Ontario)
- Presented by: L. David Dube and Jim Mullin (2017–present)

History
- First award: Nathan Rourke, QB, 2017
- Most recent: Antwan Raymond, RB, 2025
- Website: cornishtrophy.com

The Jon Cornish Trophy is an award given annually to the top Canadian player in NCAA football. The award is named after Canadian Football Hall of Famer (CFHOF) Jon Cornish and has been presented since 2017, with the trophy debuting two years later on display at the CFHOF.

It is awarded by a panel consisting of Canadian journalists, player personnel evaluators from the Canadian Football League, former NCAA players with a connection to Canada, and panelists from Gridiron Nation. Nathan Rourke and John Metchie III are the only two to have ever won it more than once.

== History ==
The trophy was first awarded at the conclusion of the 2017 NCAA football season to honor the top Canadian player in American college football, where it was presented to Ohio Bobcats quarterback Nathan Rourke from Oakville, Ontario. The award is named after Jon Cornish, a former running back at the University of Kansas who would later play for the Calgary Stampeders of the Canadian Football League, where he would win three Most Outstanding Canadian awards as well as the CFL's Most Outstanding Player Award and Lou Marsh Trophy (now the Northern Star Award) in 2013 before being inducted into the Canadian Football Hall of Fame in 2019.

Rourke would win the award again the following season before Oklahoma State running back and Sherwood Park native Chuba Hubbard was named the winner for the 2019 season, earning the award after leading the FBS in rushing with 2,094 yards. Alabama wide receiver and Brampton local John Metchie III won the award for the 2020–21 and 2021–22 seasons; Metchie was a key component of the Crimson Tide's national championship run in 2020 and posted a 1,000-yard receiving season in 2021. Illinois running back and London, Ontario, native Chase Brown won the award in 2022 after leading all Power Five teams in rushing with 1,643 yards. In 2023, honours went to Stanford wide receiver Elic Ayomanor, a Medicine Hat, Alberta native who amassed over 1,000 yards receiving, including a school-record 294 yards against Colorado. The 2024 winner was Kurtis Rourke, a graduate student quarterback from Oakville, Ontario who led the Indiana Hoosiers to an 11–2 record, their best season since 1946. Kurtis is the younger brother of Nathan, who won the first two awards. 2025's honoree was running back Antwan Raymond, a Montreal native who rushed for 1,241 yards and 13 touchdowns for Rutgers, including a game against Maryland where he tied the school record for carries in a game with 41.

The patrons of the trophy are the Northern 8 group led by businessman L. David Dube and Football Canada president Jim Mullin. It is awarded by a panel consisting of Canadian journalists, Canadian Football League player personnel evaluators, former NCAA players with a connection to Canada, and panelists from Gridiron Nation.

The primary trophy, featuring an image of Cornish superimposed on a background that incorporates a maple leaf and a five-pointed star, is kept on permanent display at the Canadian Football Hall of Fame. The recipient is presented with a separate personalized trophy featuring an image from the player's trophy-winning season. The base of the trophy is engraved with the surnames of Canadian-born and/or -raised players who were successful in American college football, including among others Bronko Nagurski, Mark Rypien, and Tim Biakabutuka. This trophy originally featured the logo of Football Canada, the country's governing body for amateur Canadian football, but that logo has been replaced by a dedicated Cornish Trophy logo.

== Winners ==
Season	Winner	Position	Team	Hometown
2017	Nathan Rourke	Quarterback	Ohio	Oakville, Ontario
2018	Nathan Rourke	Quarterback	Ohio	Oakville, Ontario
2019	Chuba Hubbard	Running back	Oklahoma State	Sherwood Park, Alberta
2020	John Metchie III	Wide receiver	Alabama	Brampton, Ontario
2021	John Metchie III	Wide receiver	Alabama	Brampton, Ontario
2022	Chase Brown	Running back	Illinois	London, Ontario
2023	Elic Ayomanor	Wide receiver	Stanford	Medicine Hat, Alberta
2024	Kurtis Rourke	Quarterback	Indiana	Oakville, Ontario
2025	Antwan Raymond	Running back	Rutgers	Montreal, Quebec

== See also ==
- Hec Crighton Trophy – award for the top player in U Sports football
