= Canada West Football on Shaw =

- Starring: Jim Mullin, play-by-play Wray Morrison, colour Andy Neal, host Mitchell Blair, play-by-play Darren Dupont, sidelines
- Country of origin: Canada

Production
- Running time: 360 minutes+

Original release
- Network: Shaw TV (2006-2016); Global (2015)

Krown Produce Canada West Football on Shaw was a presentation of Canada West football aired on Shaw TV, Shaw Direct and Access7. In 2012, broadcasts were streamed on CanadaWest.tv.

Shaw TV added to their network-wide sports coverage which offered only WHL games, with Canada West Football in 2006. The network broadcast six of eight weeks plus playoffs and Hardy Cup game through 2009.

In 2010, Shaw TV began to cover a game every week, plus one of two semifinals and the Hardy Cup.

In 2011, Shaw TV lost the Hardy Cup broadcast rights to TSN but began to cover both semifinal games.

Prior to the 2012 season, Shaw and Canada West renewed their agreement for another three years. In 2012, Shaw sold the title sponsorship to Krown Produce of Saskatoon. Shaw broadcast a game of the week and two semifinals. TSN continued to broadcast the Hardy Trophy. The Hardy Trophy returned to Shaw in 2013.

In 2015, in addition to regular season coverage on Shaw TV, coverage of one semi-final and the Hardy Trophy final would be broadcast nationally by the Global Television Network (then owned by Shaw subsidiary Shaw Media) and produced and managed by N8 Group, producers of Krown Countdown U.

"We are fortunate to have three willing and progressive partners in Shaw, Global Television, and Canada West who embrace the vision of enhancing the exposure to Canadians for CIS football by way of the Canada West Conference playoffs," said L. David Dube N8 Group Founding Partner. The broadcasts were distributed to 10.2 million Canadian households.

In 2016, Shaw, Access Communications and N8 Group produced 14 games which included playoffs. This included the first broadcast and event out of Mosaic Stadium, a game featuring the Saskatchewan Huskies and Regina Rams which set a conference record with 16,500 in attendance.

In 2017, Canada West announced that it had reached an agreement with Bell MTS, SaskTel and Telus TV for 12 regular season games and coverage of the semi-finals and Hardy Cup game.

== Commentators ==
=== Play-by-play ===
- Jim Mullin (2006 – 2016)
- Wray Morrison (2006 - 2011)
- Tim Dancy (2006)
- Mitchell Blair (2015 - 2016)
- Warren Woods (2016)

=== Colour commentary ===
- Dan Eliott (2006 - 2010)
- Jim Mullin (2010)
- Laurence Nixon (2011 - 2014)
- Jesse Lumsden (2012 - 2015)
- Daved Benefield (2011 - 2012)
- Matt Sheridan (2012)
- Mike Siroshka (2011)
- Erik Glavic (2011)
- Gord Randall (2015)
- Wray Morrison (2015-2016)

=== Hosts ===
- Andy Neal (2012 - 2016)
- Rod Pedersen (2016)

=== Sideline reporters ===
Vancouver:

- Kevin Cady (2006 - 2007)
- Stu Walters (2008 - 2016)

Calgary/Edmonton:

- Alanna Nolan (2011 - 2016)
- Brendan Parker (2007 - 2010)

Saskatoon/Regina:

- Dave Thomas (2009 - 2015)
- Dave Dawson (2014)
- Darren Dupont (2015 - 2016)
- Mitchell Blair (2015 - 2016)

Winnipeg:

- Jim Toth (2008 - 2015)
