= Chuck Dalton =

Canadian basketball player

Canada National Basketball Team
- League: 1952 Summer Olympics

Personal information
- Born: September 1, 1927 (age 99) Windsor, Ontario, Canada

Career information
- College: University of Western Ontario
- Playing career: 1940s–1952

Charles “Chuck” Harwood Dalton (September 1, 1927 – January 12, 2013) was a Canadian basketball player who competed in the 1952 Summer Olympics.

Dalton was born in Windsor, Ontario, graduated from London South Collegiate Institute in 1946, and attended the University of Western Ontario. He was a member of the Canadian basketball team which was eliminated after the group stage in the 1952 tournament. He played three matches.
