= Krown Countdown U =

- Also known as: Gridiron Nation presented by Krown Produce
- Starring: Jim Mullin; Mike Hogan; Gord Randall
- Country of origin: Canada

Production
- Production locations: Vancouver, British Columbia (2011-2017), Surrey, British Columbia, (2017-present); On location (various episodes, 2013, Thunderbird Stadium; 2013 Saskatoon, Saskatchewan; 2014, Saskatoon, 2017, Knoxville, TN; Grand Forks, ND; Hamilton, ON.; Mexico City, 2018; London, United Kingdom, 2019.
- Running time: 30 minutes

Original release
- Network: TSN
- Release: 2011 – present

Gridiron Nation presented by Krown Produce is a weekly college football recap and features show focusing on Canadians in the NCAA and USPORTS football. The show was previously known as Krown Countdown U until 2019 when the show moved to TSN across Canada. The show generally airs on Wednesday at 1pm ET and Friday at 3:30pm ET on TSN1 or TSN2.

Previously, it was a recap and pre-game show broadcast by CHCH-DT across Canada, Thursday nights at 11:30 pm ET after local news and sports during football season. In the 2018 season the show's online distribution partner was CBC Sports. "KCU" complimented CHCH's coverage of OUA college football which was broadcast periodically on Saturday afternoons during the college football season. It was aired prior to the start of OUA game broadcasts with a 1:00 p.m. ET kickoff. In its current form, the program is pre-recorded at HubCast Studios in Surrey, BC as a panel show, with one member of the panel participating via Skype from Central Canada. The show recapped mainly USports football games, features, news and analysis of the week's upcoming games with additional content focusing on Canadian content in NCAA football, Football Canada national teams, and the Canadian Junior Football League.

== Seasons ==
=== Season one: CIS Countdown, 2011 ===
It first aired as CIS Countdown in September 2011 with Jim Mullin as host and Chad Klassen and Andrew Wadden as commentators, providing an overview of Canadian university football games on SHAW TV throughout Western Canada. The show was developed in conjunction with MRX and Associates as a means to promote the 2011 Vanier Cup at BC Place Stadium. In the first season, there were 10 episodes produced.

=== Season two: Krown Canadian University Countdown, 2012 ===
There were changes for the 2012 season, after Krown Produce became the title sponsor of the show. This included a name change to "Canadian University Countdown". Ryan Sullivan joined Wadden on the highlight desk as an anchor team, eliminating most of the duties of the host position. Mullin shifted to the panel with Hec Crighton Award winning quarterback Billy Greene joining the show as a full-time panelist and the two would remain together through the 2013–14 season. The number of stations carrying the show grew as well, with COGECO TV carrying the show in Kingston and Windsor-Essex. Cable 14 broadcast the show throughout the Hamilton region. The show was integrated into Canada West broadcast coverage on SHAW TV. Additional panelists from across the country were included via Skype, including former Sherbrooke quarterback J.P. Shoiry, Rogers Sportsnet contributor Donnovan Bennett, Justin Dunk, Charles-Antoine Sinotte and freelance writer Andrew Bucholtz rotating in the guest panelist position. There were 16 episodes produced, running from September through December.

=== Season three to six: Krown Countdown U on Shaw TV and affiliates, 2013–2017 ===
The show changed its name again for the 2013 season, to the current Krown Countdown U. The show expanded to 20 episodes, with monthly off-season episodes running from January through May. Rogers TV stations throughout Ontario picked up the show in Ottawa, Guelph, London and Kitchener-Waterloo. Eastlink cable picked up the show for broadcast throughout the four Atlantic provinces.

The format remained mainly intact from the previous two seasons. The show went on location to start the Canada West Football season on Shaw TV, with the kickoff game in Saskatoon in 2013 and 2014. The show became the pregame show for Krown Canada West Football on Shaw.

The on-screen antics of Wadden and Sullivan developed a minor cult following in the football world. In a feature on the Laval Rouge et Or football team Newsweek wrote, "There is a weekly highlight show, Krown Countdown U, that resembles what would happen if ESPN’s College GameDay mated with SCTV’s Bob and Doug McKenzie. During a recent highlights package, co-host Ryan Sullivan quipped of a player who ran back a punt for a touchdown, “He is gone, like a bullet that was shot out of a gun that shoots bullets.”

In 2014, former UBC Thunderbirds and Queen's Gaels offensive lineman Gord Randall replaced Greene, who left Canada to play football in Europe. Also in 2014, former UBC Thunderbirds head coach Shawn Olson hosted a segment named "X's and Olson" which uses a telestrator to break down plays in 12-man football. Through 2015 and 2016 the format remained the same, with Justin Dunk assuming most of the guest panel spots from Toronto. There were 15 in-season episodes from late August through November, and monthly episodes from January through CFL/NFL draft season in May. The show's producer won the Paul Carson Award in 2016 for promotion and development of varsity sports in Canada.

==== KCU and the Northern 8 ====
L. David Dube is the principal owner of Krown Produce and has underwritten the cost of production through sponsorship of the program. Dube and Mullin as project partners started planning and discussion around the Northern 8, a proposed schedule of competition which would place the best CIS/USports football teams from across the country in a nationally televised game of the week. Much of the discussion surrounding the proposal was content for the panel on KCU. During the height of the first attempt to broaden competition in the winter of 2014–15, KCU produced a specific show about what the Northern 8 was, with Dube explaining the concept.

==== Season seven: The move from Shaw and Canada West to CHCH and national coverage, 2017–2018 ====
There were many changes for the 2017 season with the shutdown of Shaw TV operations in Edmonton, Calgary and Vancouver. Canada West moved to an online pay-per-view model with games and paired with SaskTel Max for games of the week. Mullin, who had been the play-by-play voice of Canada West football for 10 years was not included in the new conference broadcast package. This resulted in the show finding a new home on CHCH, which significantly increased the household reach across Canada to 6.8 million and aligned the product with the OUA. An online edition was posted on 3DownNation after the show was distributed to CHCH. The anchoring team of Wadden and Sullivan was replaced by Mullin as the anchor, with Randall and TSN 1050 and Toronto Argonauts play-by-play voice Mike Hogan completing the roster of the full panel. Olson continued X's and Olson. With Mullin off the play-by-play beat, more focus was placed on NCAA Football and Canadian players on Division I teams. This included Mullin anchoring from Knoxville, Tennessee and Grand Forks, North Dakota along with on-site interviews and visits in Atlanta, Georgia, Athens, Ohio, Seattle, Washington and Buffalo, New York. There was also an episode produced out of the CHCH studios in Hamilton after the Vanier Cup.

Season eight: Partnership with CBC Sports and IFAF

In July 2018, CBC Sports, International Federation of American Football, and KCU announced a partnership to broadcast major IFAF events within Canada on CBC's online service. As part of the agreement, CBC also became the online home for KCU TV.

=== Season nine: TSN Gridiron Nation presented by Krown Produce, 2019 - current ===
The show rebranded in 2019 with the move to TSN as "Gridiron Nation presented by Krown Produce" a.k.a. "Krown Gridiron Nation on TSN". The majority of content focused on Canadian participation in the NCAA, with some additional coverage provided to U SPORTS football. The NCAA content is in keeping with TSN's content agreement with the NCAA and ESPN.

==== Distribution and broadcast partners since 2011 ====
Date	Sea.	No. ep.	Broadcaster
2011	s01	10	SHAW TV Vancouver, Calgary, Saskatoon, Winnipeg and COGECO TV Kingston
2012	s02	15	SHAW TV throughout Western Canada and Northern Ontario, Shaw Direct 299 across Canada, Access 7 Saskatchewan, COGECO TV Kingston, Cable 14 Hamilton-Burlington.
2013–2014	s03	20	SHAW TV full network, Shaw Direct, Access 7, COGECO Kingston, Cable 14, COGECO Windsor-Essex, Rogers TV Ottawa, Rogers TV London and Region, Rogers TV Kitchener-Waterloo, Rogers TV Guelph, Eastlink TV to four Atlantic provinces.
2014–2015	s04	21	SHAW TV full network, Shaw Direct, Access 7, COGECO Kingston, Cable 14, COGECO Windsor-Essex, Rogers TV Ottawa, Rogers TV London and Region, Rogers TV Kitchener-Waterloo, Rogers TV Guelph, Eastlink TV to four Atlantic provinces.
2015 - 2016	s05	20	SHAW TV full network, Shaw Direct, Access 7, COGECO Kingston, Cable 14, COGECO Windsor-Essex, Rogers TV Ottawa, Rogers TV London and Region, Rogers TV Kitchener-Waterloo, Rogers TV Guelph.
2016–2017	s06	20	SHAW TV full network, Shaw Direct, Access 7, COGECO Kingston, Cable 14, COGECO Windsor-Essex, Rogers TV Ottawa, Rogers TV London and Region, Rogers TV Kitchener-Waterloo, Rogers TV Guelph.
2017–2018	s07	20	CHCH – DT Hamilton, ON to 6.8 million Canadian households, individual SHAW TV stations in Saskatoon, Winnipeg and Thompson, MB, Access 7 Saskatchewan, 3DownNation.com
2018–2019	s08	17	CHCH – DT Hamilton, ON to 6.8 million Canadian households, and online via CBC Sports
2019-2020	s09	15	TSN - The Sports Network to +9 million Canadian households.

== The #Power7 ==
With each episode, the staff of KCU rates the performance of the teams of USports in a power rating known as the #Power7. It is an alternative ranking system to the USports Top 10, but is not officially recognized by any conference or school in Canada. The 2017 #Power7 accurately reflected the eventual outcome of the Vanier Cup, with the Western Ontario Mustangs in first place, and the Laval Rouge et Or in second for the final weeks. The USports voting panel had Laval in the first spot of the Top 10, with Western in second over the final few weeks.

2017 Final

1. Western Mustangs 2. Laval Rouge et Or 3. Calgary Dinos 4. Montreal Carabins 5. UBC Thunderbirds 6. Laurier Golden Hawks 7. McMaster Marauders

2018 Final

1. Laval Rouge et Or 2. Western Mustangs 3. Saskatchewan Huskies 4. Montreal Carabins 5. Calgary Dinos 6. Guelph Gryphons 7. UBC Thunderbirds

2019 Final

1. Montreal Carabins 2. Calgary Dinos 3. Laval Rouge et Or 4. McMaster Marauders 5. Western Mustangs 6. Saskatchewan Huskies 7. Waterloo Warriors

== Krown Countdown U Radio, 2017–2019 ==
From January 2017 until March 2019, Krown Countdown U produced a weekly radio show during college and university sports seasons available at various times on the affiliates of the TSN Radio Network with the flagship station out of Vancouver's TSN 1040. The program is also carried on the Rawlco Radio Network to affiliates in Saskatoon and Regina. The program ran from late August to December, and mid-January to mid-May and is one hour in duration. Mullin co-hosted from Vancouver with Hogan at the TSN 1050 studios in Toronto. Wadden provided the "Canadian Box Score" which recapped and previewed the college sports week in both Canada and the United States from a Canadian perspective. During the football season, Gord Randall was a regular contributor in an editorial position.

The radio program covered football, college hockey and basketball in the winter-spring months. It was almost exclusively a football show in the summer and fall.

=== On-camera and on-air personalities on both TV and radio ===
Date	Name	Title	Affiliation
2011–present	Jim Mullin	Project partner-producer-host	Northern 8
2014–present	Gord Randall	Panelist	CW on Global TV
2017–present	Mike Hogan	Panelist	TSN Radio
2019	Farhan Lalji	Reporter	TSN
2019	Dave Naylor	Reporter	TSN
2019	Jesse Palmer	Analyst	ABC/ESPN
2015–2018	Shawn Olson	Feature presenter	
2011–2017	Andrew Wadden	Anchor-analyst-line producer	TSN Radio
2012–2016	Ryan Sullivan	Anchor	
2013 - 2014	Billy Greene	Panelist	
2015 - 2017	Justin Dunk	Panelist	Sportsnet
2016	Craig Smith	Guest Panelist	
2013	Connor Hammond	Feature presenter	
2012	Richard Zussman	Feature presenter	
2012 - 2015	J.P. Shoiry	Panelist	SRC
2014–2015	Donnovan Bennett	Guest Panelist	Sportsnet
2012 - 2015	Andrew Bucholtz	Panelist	Yahoo.ca
2014–2016	Jesse Lumsden	Panelist	Shaw TV
2011	Chad Klassen	Host	
2016	C-A Sinotte	Guest Panelist	TVA Sports
2015–2016	Lee Barrette	Guest Panelist	Canada Football Chat
2015	L. David Dube	Project Partner/Spokesperson	Northern 8
2022	Dashawn Stephens	Guest Panelist	PRSVRE Media Group

== Krown Gridiron Nation Podcast, 2019-Present ==
Gridiron Nation presented by Krown Produce replaced the radio show with a podcast in the fall of 2019.
