= Sydney Brown (American football) =

American football player (born 2000)

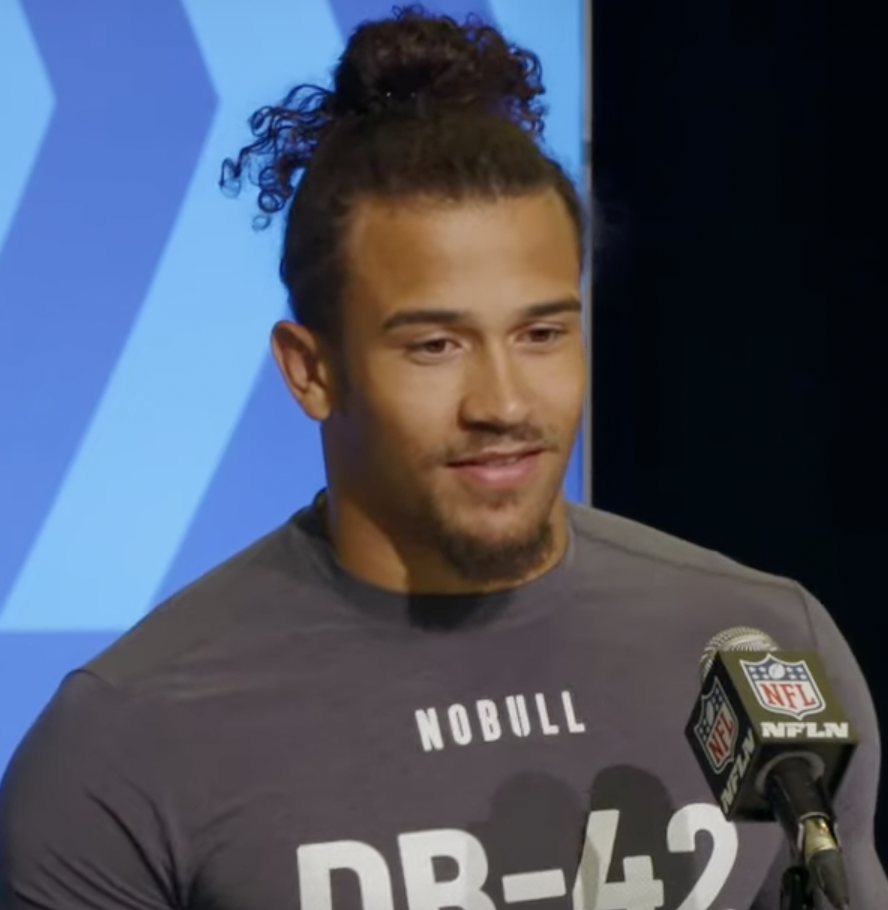
- Brown at the 2023 NFL Combine

No. 29 – Atlanta Falcons
- Position: Safety
- Roster status: Active

Personal information
- Born: March 21, 2000 (age 26); London, Ontario, Canada
- Listed height: 5 ft 10 in (1.78 m)
- Listed weight: 211 lb (96 kg)

Career information
- High school: South Collegiate (London); Saint Stephen's (Bradenton, Florida, U.S.)
- College: Illinois (2018–2022)
- NFL draft: 2023: 3rd round, 66th overall pick

Career history
- Philadelphia Eagles (2023–2025); Atlanta Falcons (2026–present)

Awards and highlights
- Super Bowl champion (LIX); First-team All-Big Ten (2022)

Career NFL statistics as of Week 10, 2026
- Total tackles: 119
- Forced fumbles: 3
- Pass deflections: 6
- Interceptions: 2
- Touchdowns: 2
- Stats at Pro Football Reference

Sydney Brown (born March 21, 2000) is a Canadian professional football safety for the Atlanta Falcons of the National Football League (NFL). He played college football for the Illinois Fighting Illini. He was selected in the third round of the 2023 NFL draft by the Philadelphia Eagles, where he was a part of the Super Bowl LIX championship team.

== Early life ==
Brown originally attended the London South Collegiate Institute in London, Ontario, Canada before transferring to Saint Stephen's Episcopal School in Bradenton, Florida in 2016, along with his twin brother, Chase Brown. Over his junior and senior seasons, he combined to have 132 tackles and three interceptions. He committed to the University of Illinois Urbana-Champaign to play college football.

== College career ==
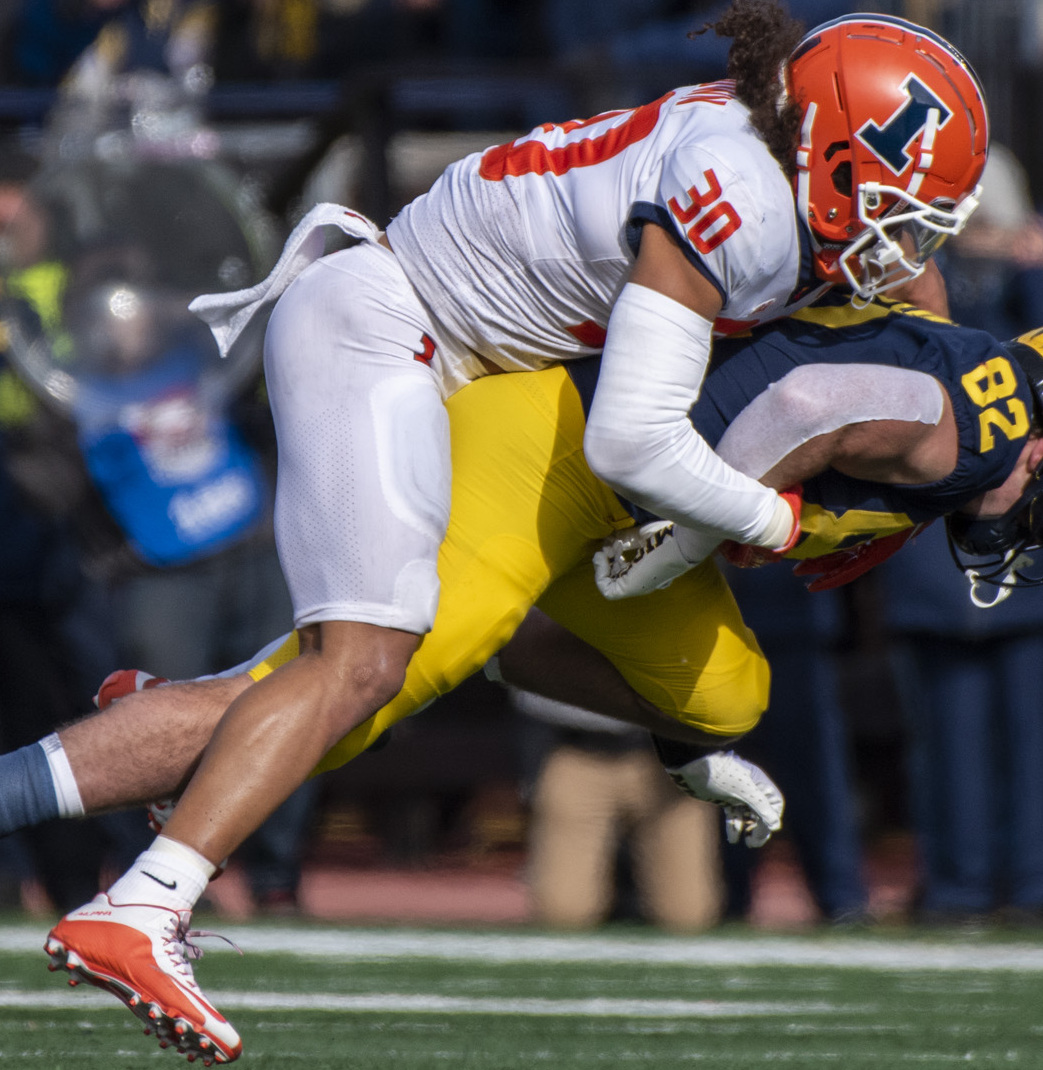
Brown (#30) with Illinois in 2022

As a true freshman at Illinois in 2018, Brown started all 10 games he played in and had 55 tackles and one interceptions. In 2019, his brother, Chase joined Illinois after a year at Western Michigan. That season, he started 10 of 11 games, recording 88 tackles, three interceptions and an interception returned for a touchdown. He started all six games in the COVID-19 shortened 2020 season, finishing with 36 tackles. In 2021, Brown started all 12 games, and had 81 tackles and one sack. He returned to Illinois for his senior year in 2022.

== Professional career ==
Pre-draft measurables
Height	Weight	Arm length	Hand span	Wingspan	40-yard dash	10-yard split	20-yard split	Vertical jump	Broad jump	Bench press
5 ft 9 3/4 in (1.77 m)	211 lb (96 kg)	31 1/2 in (0.80 m)	10 1/4 in (0.26 m)	6 ft 4 in (1.93 m)	4.47 s	1.51 s	2.55 s	40.5 in (1.03 m)	10 ft 10 in (3.30 m)	23 reps
All values from the NFL Combine

=== Philadelphia Eagles ===
Brown was ranked the #3 Canadian prospect ahead of the 2023 CFL draft, but ultimately went undrafted.

The Philadelphia Eagles selected Brown in the third round (66th overall) of the 2023 NFL draft. He notably became the last of five defensive backs drafted from the same Illinois' secondary spanning from 2018 to 2020. His fellow defensive backs from Illinois included Nate Hobbs (2021), Kerby Joseph (2022), Devon Witherspoon (2023), and Quan Martin (2023).

In Week 17 against the Arizona Cardinals, Brown recorded his first career interception and touchdown on the same play when he returned an interception 99 yards off a Kyler Murray pass. In Week 18 against the New York Giants, Brown tore his ACL, ending his season.

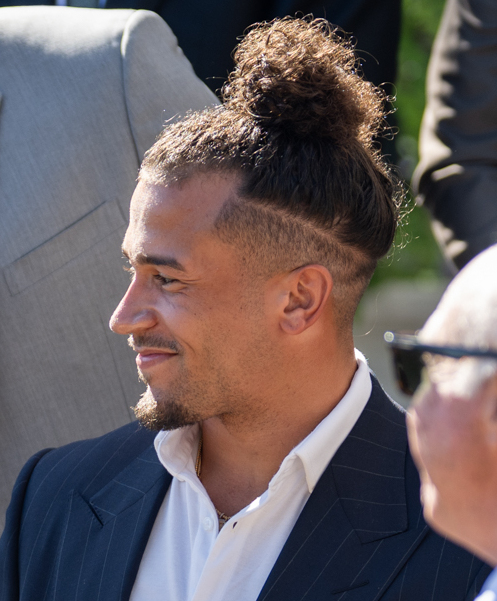
Brown at the White House following the Eagles' Super Bowl LIX victory.

Brown began the 2024 season on the reserve/PUP list, and activated on October 19, 2024. Brown won a Super Bowl ring when the Eagles defeated the Kansas City Chiefs 40–22 in Super Bowl LIX.

In Week 4 of the 2025 season against the Tampa Bay Buccaneers, Brown returned a punt that was blocked by teammate Cameron Latu 35 yards for a touchdown in the Eagles' 31–25 win.

=== Atlanta Falcons ===
On March 21, 2026, Brown, along with Philadelphia's 122nd and 215th overall picks in the 2026 NFL draft, was traded to the Atlanta Falcons in exchange for their 114th and 197th overall picks.

== NFL career statistics ==
Legend
	Won the Super Bowl
**Bold**	Career high

=== Regular season ===
Year	Team	Games		Tackles					Interceptions						Fumbles			
Year	Team	GP	GS	Cmb	Solo	Ast	Sck	TFL	PD	Int	Yds	Avg	Lng	TD	FF	FR	Yds	TD
2023	PHI	14	6	**45**	**32**	13	0.0	**1**	**3**	**1**	**99**	**99.0**	**99**	**1**	**1**	0	0	0
2024	PHI	11	0	7	6	1	0.0	0	2	**1**	21	21.0	21	0	**1**	0	0	0
2025	PHI	17	3	34	17	**17**	0.0	0	0	0	0	0.0	0	0	0	0	0	0
2026	ATL	10	6	33	20	13	0.0	1	1	0	0	0.0	0	0	1	0	0	0
Career		52	15	119	75	44	0.0	2	6	2	120	60.0	99	1	3	0	0	0

=== Postseason ===
Year	Team	Games		Tackles					Interceptions						Fumbles			
Year	Team	GP	GS	Cmb	Solo	Ast	Sck	TFL	PD	Int	Yds	Avg	Lng	TD	FF	FR	Yds	TD
2024	PHI	4	0	3	**1**	2	0.0	0	0	0	0	0.0	0	0	0	0	0	0
2025	PHI	1	0	**4**	**1**	**3**	0.0	0	0	0	0	0.0	0	0	0	0	0	0
Career		5	0	7	2	5	0.0	0	0	0	0	0.0	0	0	0	0	0	0

== Personal life ==
Brown is the identical twin brother of Cincinnati Bengals running back Chase Brown. The two were teammates at Illinois.
