= Chase Brown =

Canadian gridiron football player (born 2000)

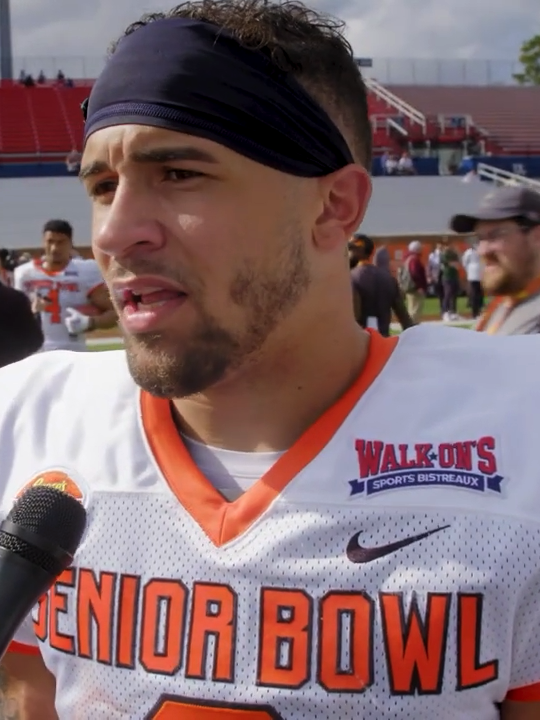
- Brown at the 2023 Senior Bowl

No. 30 – Cincinnati Bengals
- Position: Running back
- Roster status: Active

Personal information
- Born: March 21, 2000 (age 26); London, Ontario, Canada
- Listed height: 5 ft 10 in (1.78 m)
- Listed weight: 210 lb (95 kg)

Career information
- High school: Saint Stephen's (Bradenton, Florida, U.S.)
- College: Western Michigan (2018); Illinois (2019–2022)
- NFL draft: 2023: 5th round, 163rd overall pick
- CFL draft: 2023: 7th round, 59th overall pick

Career history
- Cincinnati Bengals (2023–present)

Awards and highlights
- Jon Cornish Trophy (2022); Second-team All-Big Ten (2022); Third-team All-Big Ten (2021)

Career NFL statistics as of 2025
- Rushing yards: 2,188
- Rushing average: 4.3
- Rushing touchdowns: 13
- Receptions: 137
- Receiving yards: 953
- Receiving touchdowns: 10
- Return yards: 230
- Stats at Pro Football Reference

Chase Brown (born March 21, 2000) is a Canadian professional football running back for the Cincinnati Bengals of the National Football League (NFL). He played one season for the Western Michigan Broncos before transferring to Illinois Fighting Illini in 2019. In his final season in 2022, he rushed for 1,643 yards and 10 TDs that culminated with him winning the Jon Cornish Trophy. He was selected by the Bengals 163rd overall in the fifth round of the 2023 NFL draft on April 29 2023

== Early life ==
Brown was born in 2000 and raised in London, Ontario, Canada. Brown originally attended the London South Collegiate Institute with his identical twin Sydney Brown, where they both played until they relocated from Canada to Florida as juniors in high school and attended Saint Stephen's Episcopal School in Bradenton, Florida. He set the school's career rushing record, but received a modest three-star rating by 247Sports.

== College career ==
=== Western Michigan ===
In October 2017, Brown verbally committed to play college football at Western Michigan University. As a freshman, he played for the 2018 Western Michigan Broncos football team and rushed for 352 yards on 71 carries for an average of five yards per carry. He also returned 12 kickoffs for 227 yards. In early 2019, Western Michigan's two freshmen stars, Brown and freshman receiver Jayden Reed, entered the NCAA transfer portal.

=== Illinois ===
Brown transferred to the University of Illinois Urbana-Champaign in 2019, joining his identical twin, Sydney, a defensive back for the Fighting Illini. Sydney noted, "This is what we dreamt about as kids. Having him come here has been like having a piece of home here in Illinois."

Brown's application for immediate eligibility was initially denied, but granted on appeal in mid-October 2019. After appearing in four games during the 2019 season, he redshirted and retained the year of eligibility. He tallied 18 rushing yards on three carries during the 2019 season.

During the COVID shutdown, Brown and Sydney returned to Canada and stayed with their grandmother, converting the garage into a gym. Brown returned to Illinois in the fall and appeared in all eight games for the Illini. On November 14, 2020, he had his first 100-yard game against Rutgers, totaling 134 rushing yards. One week later, he rushed for 115 yards and two touchdowns against Nebraska. For the season, he totaled 540 rushing yards on 104 carries (5.2 yards per carry). At the end of the season, he was selected in fan voting as the Fans Choice Canadian NCAA Player of the Year.

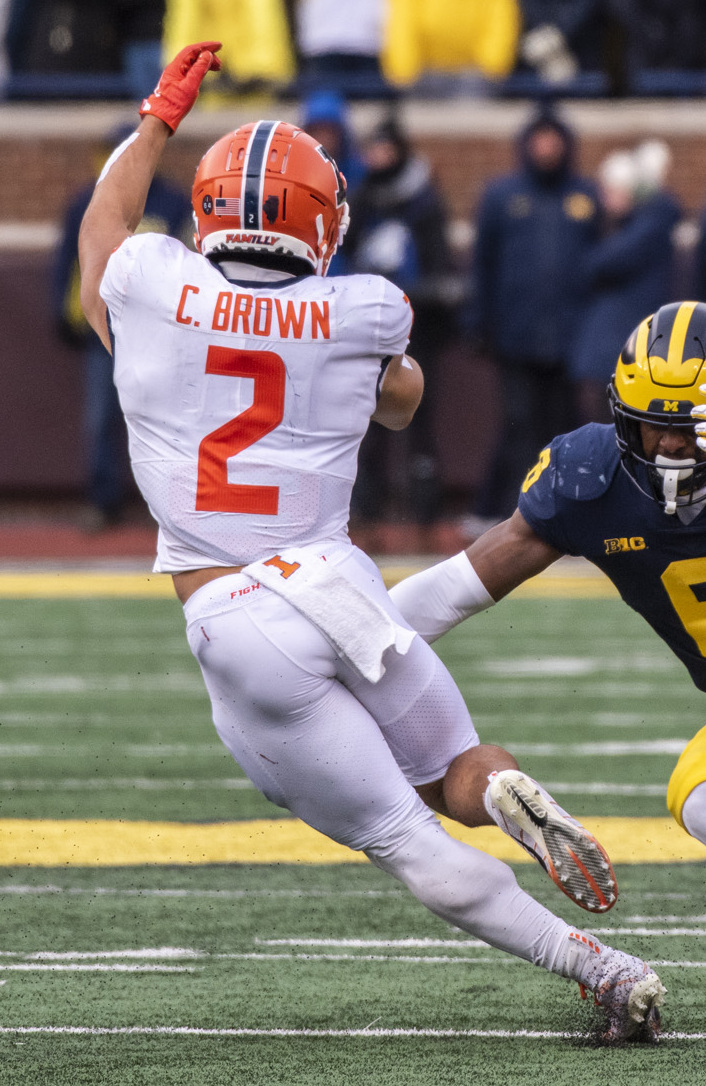
Brown with Illinois in 2022

With eligibility not impacted by the 2020 season, Brown remained classified as a sophomore in 2021. On October 2, 2021, he rushed for a career-high 257 yards against Charlotte – the fourth-highest single-game rushing total in Illinois history. Three weeks later, he rushed for 229 yards in the Illini's NCAA-record nine-overtime victory over No. 7 Penn State. His 223 yards was the most ever tallied by an opposing player at Penn State's Beaver Stadium. For the full 2021 season, Brown rushed for 1,005 yards on 170 carries, and his average of 100.5 rushing yards per game ranked second in the Big Ten Conference. Brown was twice named Big Ten Offensive Player of the Week in 2021 and received third-team honors on the 2021 All-Big Ten Conference football team.

In the 2022 season opener against Wyoming, Brown rushed for 151 yards and three touchdowns on 19 carries. He was named Big Ten Offensive Player of the Week after the first week. Against Indiana on September 2, he rushed for 199 yards and was selected as the first winner of the Doak Walker National Running Back of the Week award. He then rushed over 100 yards in each of the next five games: 146 yards against Virginia on September 10; 108 yards against Chattanooga on September 22; 129 yards against Wisconsin on October 1; 146 yards against Iowa on October 8; and 180 yards against Minnesota on October 15. His yardage against Minnesota pushed him over the 1,000-yard mark, making him the first player to reach the mark in 2022 and the third Illinois player to rush for over 1,000 yards in consecutive years. Brown finished second nationally with 1,643 rushing yards. He was later awarded the 2022 Jon Cornish Trophy as the top Canadian player in NCAA football.

== Professional career ==
Pre-draft measurables
Height	Weight	Arm length	Hand span	Wingspan	40-yard dash	10-yard split	20-yard split	Vertical jump	Broad jump	Bench press
5 ft 9 1/2 in (1.77 m)	209 lb (95 kg)	31 in (0.79 m)	10 in (0.25 m)	6 ft 3 1/8 in (1.91 m)	4.43 s	1.53 s	2.57 s	40.0 in (1.02 m)	10 ft 7 in (3.23 m)	25 reps
All values from the NFL Combine

Brown was ranked the #2 Canadian prospect ahead of the 2023 CFL draft, where he was drafted in the 7th round (59th overall) by the Montreal Alouettes.

=== 2023 ===
Brown was selected by the Cincinnati Bengals in the fifth round, 163rd overall pick, of the 2023 NFL draft. He was placed on injured reserve on October 28, 2023, with a hamstring injury, and reactivated on November 25. In Week 14 against the Indianapolis Colts, Brown scored his first NFL touchdown on a 54-yard pass from Jake Browning; he finished the day with 105 total yards on three catches and eight carries.

=== 2024 ===
Brown began the 2024 season as the second running back on the depth chart behind Zack Moss, as well as the team's starting kickoff returner. In Week 4 against the Carolina Panthers, Brown had a breakout game, rushing for 80 yards and two touchdowns. He had his first career start against the New York Giants in Week 6, in which he fumbled in the final two minutes of the game, though a failed recovery by Jason Pinnock led to the ball being pushed out of bounds. He finished the game with 10 carries for 53 yards, and scored the game winning touchdown. After Moss suffered a season-ending neck injury, Brown was named the starter for the remainder of the season and was relieved of his special teams duties. His lone 100-yard rushing performance came in the Bengals' Week 9 win over the Las Vegas Raiders, finishing the game with 120 rushing yards, 37 receiving yards, and one touchdown. Brown suffered an ankle injury during the Week 17 win against the Denver Broncos, leading him to miss the Bengals' final game of the season against the Pittsburgh Steelers. He finished the season with 990 rushing yards, 360 receiving yards, and 12 combined touchdowns.

=== 2025 ===
In his third season with the Bengals, Brown began the 2025 season as the starting running back. Partly due to injury to Joe Burrow, Brown and the Bengals offensive as a whole struggled to begin the season; Brown averaged only 32 rushing yards per game through the first 5 games, never topping more than 47 yards in a single game. After Joe Flacco was traded to the Bengals, Brown's performance significantly improved over the remainder 12 games of the season, averaging 72 rushing yards per game with three 100-yard rushing performances. He finished the season with 1019 rushing yards and 6 rushing touchdowns, along with 360 receiving yards, and 5 receiving touchdowns.

== Career statistics ==
Legend
**Bold**	Career high

=== NFL ===
Year	Team	Games		Rushing					Receiving					Kick returns					Fumbles	
Year	Team	GP	GS	Att	Yds	Avg	Lng	TD	Rec	Yds	Avg	Lng	TD	Ret	Yds	Avg	Lng	TD	Fum	Lost
2023	CIN	12	0	44	179	4.1	31	0	14	156	**11.1**	**54**	1	2	44	22.0	27	0	1	0
2024	CIN	16	10	229	990	4.3	**40**	**7**	54	360	6.7	34	4	**7**	**186**	**26.6**	**29**	0	**2**	**1**
2025	CIN	17	17	**232**	**1,019**	**4.4**	37	6	**69**	**437**	6.3	23	**5**	0	0	0	0	0	**2**	**1**
Career		45	27	505	2,188	4.3	40	13	137	953	7.0	54	10	9	230	25.6	29	0	5	2

=== College ===
Year	Team	GP	Rushing				Receiving			
Year	Team	GP	Att	Yds	Avg	TD	Rec	Yds	Avg	TD
2018	Western Michigan	13	71	352	5.0	0	10	75	7.5	0
2019	Illinois	4	3	18	**6.0**	0	0	0	0.0	0
2020	Illinois	8	104	540	5.2	3	7	64	9.1	0
2021	Illinois	10	170	1,005	5.9	5	14	142	**10.1**	0
2022	Illinois	12	**328**	**1,643**	5.0	**10**	**27**	**240**	8.9	**3**
Career		47	676	3,558	5.3	18	58	521	9.0	3

== Personal life ==
Brown is the identical twin brother of Atlanta Falcons safety Sydney Brown. The two were teammates at Illinois.
