= Alex Pierzchalski =

Canadian football player (born 1991)

No. 82
- Position: Wide receiver

Personal information
- Born: August 7, 1991 (age 35); Toronto, Ontario, Canada
- Listed height: 6 ft 5 in (1.96 m)
- Listed weight: 220 lb (100 kg)

Career information
- High school: London South (London, Ontario)
- University: Toronto
- CFL draft: 2014: 2nd round, 18th overall pick

Career history
- 2014: Saskatchewan Roughriders
- 2015–2016: Ottawa Redblacks
- 2017: Montreal Alouettes
- Stats at CFL.ca

Alex Pierzchalski (born August 7, 1991) is a Canadian former professional football wide receiver who played in the Canadian Football League (CFL). He was selected by the Saskatchewan Roughriders in the second round of the 2014 CFL draft after playing Canadian Interuniversity Sport football at the University of Toronto.

== Early life ==
Pierzchalski attended London South Collegiate Institute in London, Ontario. He played four seasons for the Toronto Varsity Blues of the University of Toronto, recording career totals of 149 receptions for 1,617 yards and 13 touchdowns in 32 games.

== Professional career ==
=== Saskatchewan Roughriders ===
Pierzchalski was drafted by the Saskatchewan Roughriders with the eighteenth pick in the 2014 CFL draft. He dressed in 13 regular season games and made four special teams tackles. He recorded his first career reception against the Calgary Stampeders on October 24, 2014. He played in both 2015 pre-season games for the Riders, recording five catches for 22 yards and a touchdown, before being among the team's final cuts on June 20, 2015. He was offered a practice roster spot by the Roughriders, but he declined in order to pursue opportunities elsewhere.

=== Ottawa Redblacks ===
Pierzchalski signed with the Ottawa Redblacks on June 22, 2015.

=== Montreal Alouettes ===
Pierzchalski played the 2017 season with Montreal. He retired after the season.
