= London South Collegiate Institute =

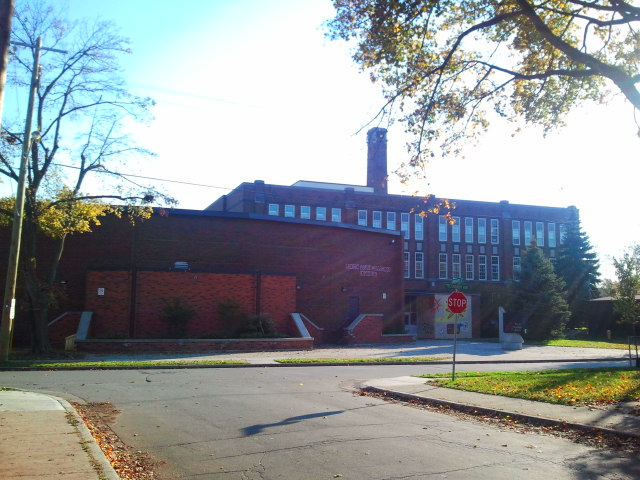
- The front entrance to South facing Tecumseh Ave.

Location
- 371 Tecumseh Avenue East, London, ON N6C 1T4; London, Ontario, N6C 1T4; Canada; 42°58′8.5″N 81°14′32.0″W

Information
- School type: Public
- Motto: Virtus Repulsae Nescia Sordidae (Courage will never know ignominious defeat.)
- Established: 1922
- School district: Thames Valley District School Board
- Principal: Richard Tamminga
- Enrollment: 780+ (2022-2023)
- Colours: Garnet and Grey
- Mascot: Lion
- Newspaper: The South Star (2023-); The Oracle (1930's, 1970's-1980's); The Confederate (1958‐69, 1971); The South Wind (1940's)
- Athletics: 25 Interscholastic teams
- Website: south.tvdsb.ca
- Last updated: August 23, 2022

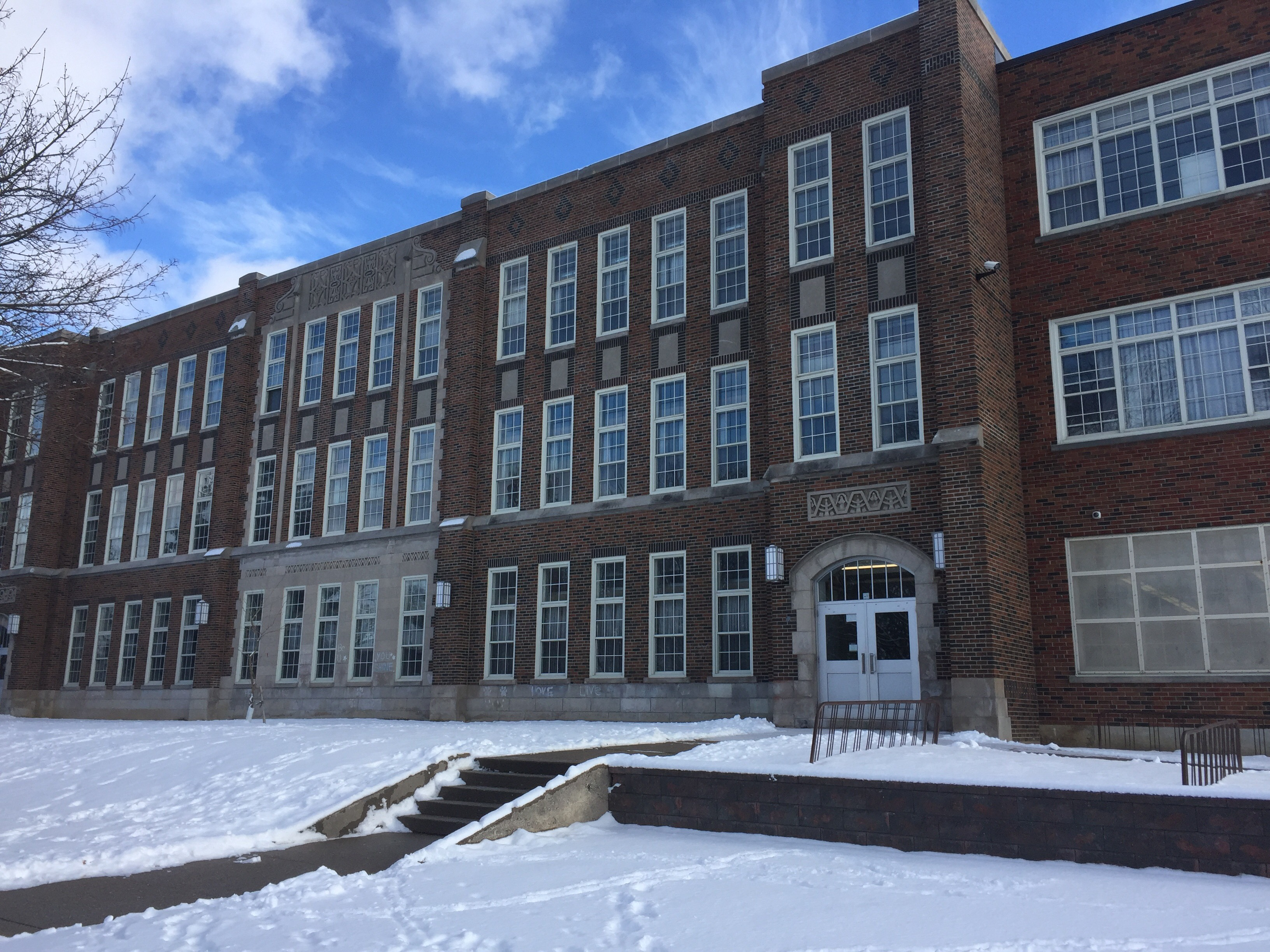
The west side of South facing Belgrave Ave. in January 2021

London South Collegiate Institute (also known as S.C.I. or South) is a public high school in London, Ontario, Canada.

South is administered by the Thames Valley District School Board. Approximately 800 students attend the school from grades 9-12. It offers a co-op program and a program for gifted students called the Academy Program.

The school colours are garnet and grey and the school mascot is the lion. South is known for its academic rigour, sports teams, and the strength of its arts program, which includes drama, visual arts, music, and dance.

The South Collegiate Alumni Association, established in 1999, organizes the school's reunions and alumni events, including annual homecoming events since 2007. South is one of the only high schools in Canada to host a homecoming with football games and a tailgate party.

== History ==
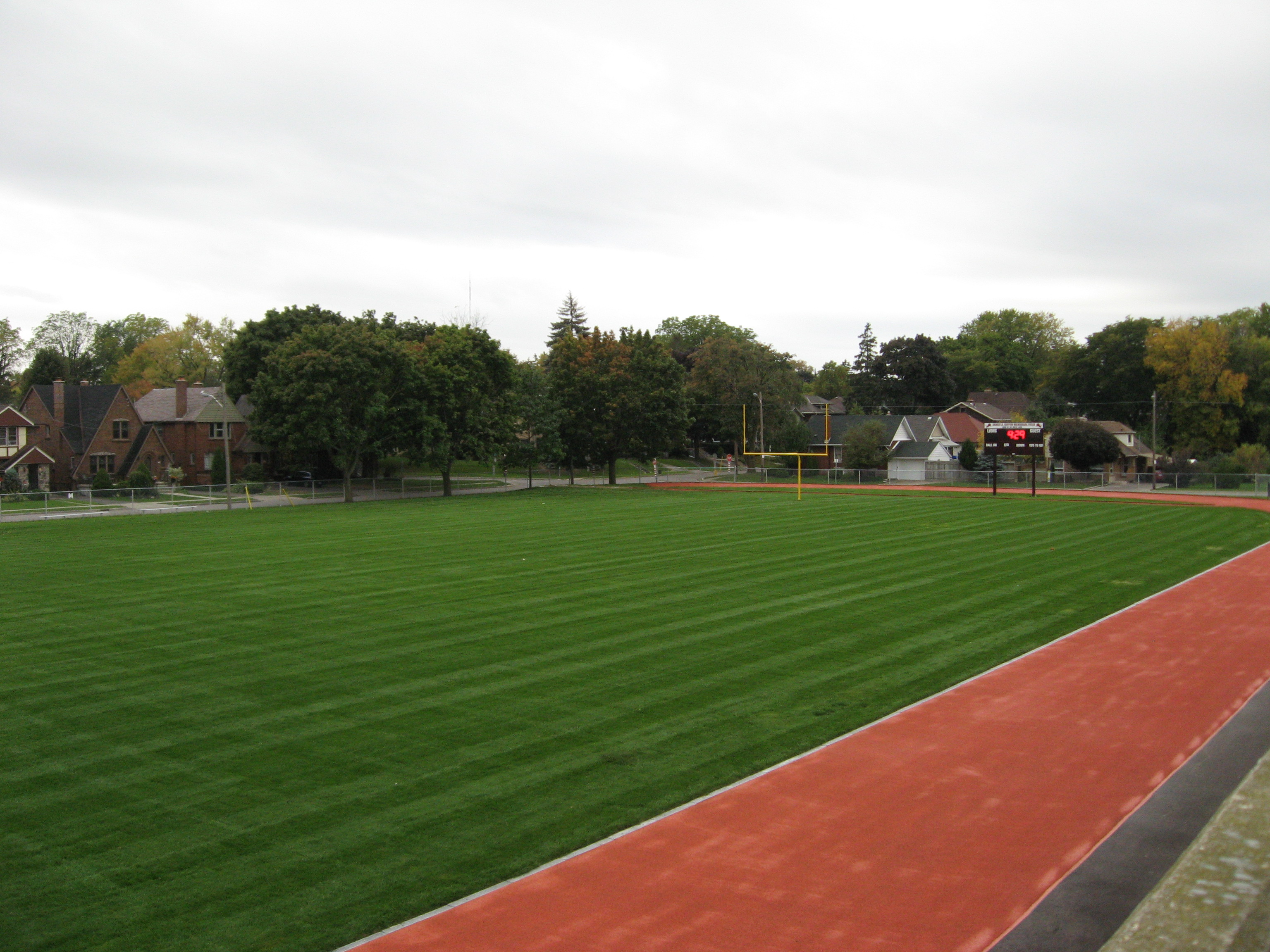
The South football field in 2009

The school first opened in 1922, at the corner of Askin Street and Wharncliffe Road South, where Victoria Public School now lies, with 290 students and 10 teachers. The growing school moved to its current location on Tecumseh Avenue in June 1928, six years later.

School pride was a focus right from the early years. According to the school's website, early students recited a daily pledge: "We're here to win the day for the garnet and grey, and to London South we pledge allegiance now." The school's Latin motto, virtus repulsae nescia sordidae, means "courage will never know ignominious defeat."

The school was formerly named “South Secondary School” for many decades, but regained its original name in 2009.

From May 24 to 26, 2013, South celebrated its 85th year at the Tecumseh Avenue location with a reunion. It commemorated the 100th anniversary of its original founding on May 26, 2023.

=== Lightning strike ===
On the evening of June 24, 2025, during an intense thunderstorm occurring during the graduation ceremony of a local elementary school hosted at South's auditorium, lightning struck the school's chimney, forcing the evacuation and relocation of the ceremony and the closure of the school the next day, on what would be students' final scheduled day of exams for the 2024-25 school year. No injuries occurred, but the strike caused the chimney to partially collapse, and a portion of the chimney fell through the roof onto the third floor. The incident, along with video of the strike captured by a witness in a car just outside the building, made national news.

== Notable alumni ==
- Dan Brodbeck, record producer
- Chuck Dalton, Olympic basketball player
- Brett Dier, actor
- Chris Doty, filmmaker, journalist
- Robert Ford, diplomat, poet
- Alex Pierzchalski, CFL football player, Saskatchewan Roughriders
- John Glassford, CFL football player, Ottawa Rough Riders
- Sydney Brown, NFL football player, Philadelphia Eagles
- Chase Brown, NFL football player, Cincinnati Bengals
- Vaughn Martin, NFL football player, San Diego Chargers, Miami Dolphins
- Ray Getliffe, former NHL hockey player, Montreal Canadiens
- Shuman Ghosemajumder, Google executive, entrepreneur
- Dennis Goulden, Emmy Award-winning producer
- Dianne Haskett, former mayor, London, Ontario
- Kate Nelligan, Oscar-nominated actress, The Prince of Tides
- Walter Stewart, journalist
- Jacob Bryson, Buffalo Sabres

== Notable faculty ==
- Lesley Thompson, Olympic athlete
- Welwyn Wilton Katz, children's author, mathematics, 1970s
- Marion Woodman, Jungian psychologist, english, 1950s-70s

== See also ==
- Education in Ontario
- List of secondary schools in Ontario
