= Shaw Spotlight =

Community channel based in Canada

- Industry: Media
- Defunct: Late 2023
- Fate: Merged into Rogers TV
- Headquarters: Calgary, Alberta, Canada; Vancouver, British Columbia, Canada
- Parent: Shaw Communications (Rogers Communications)
- Website: www.shawspotlight.ca

Shaw Spotlight (formerly Shaw TV) was the name of locally based community channel services operated by cable TV provider Shaw Communications. The channels are available only to Shaw Cable subscribers and are produced in communities throughout western Canada.

Each station runs programming produced by staff and/or volunteers. Most stations broadcast a variety of programming, including community interest segments, studio shows, city council meetings, sports, community bulletin board messages, and public service announcements.

Some programs are aired only locally, while others are aired throughout a province or region. Shaw Direct airs many of the features and shows from "Shaw TV" on channel 299 (or channel 2 depending on the line-up). This channel is not branded as "Shaw TV" but as "Shaw Direct TV". It also airs selected other features relating to Shaw Direct programming such as a PPV (Pay-Per-View) movie preview show called "Movie Loft" and regional news for areas where a local station is not carried (notably CBC Newfoundland & Labrador).

In April 2017, Shaw announced that it would shut down its Shaw TV community channels in Calgary, Edmonton, and Vancouver on August 15, 2017, under new policies allowing television providers that also own terrestrial stations in "metropolitan" markets to redirect funding from their community channels to support the news operations of the terrestrial station (in this case, the Global stations owned by sister company Corus Entertainment).

In late 2018, Shaw TV channels began rebranding as "Shaw Spotlight", as reflected by new on-air graphics, website and social media accounts. After Shaw was acquired by and amalgamated into Rogers Communications in 2023, Shaw Spotlight channels again rebranded to and merged with Rogers TV.

Logo used from 2014-2018

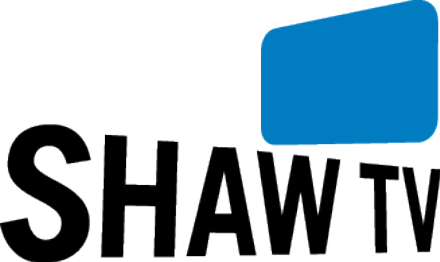
Logo used from 2012-2014

== Communities with a Shaw Spotlight community channel ==
- Campbell River, British Columbia
- Castlegar, British Columbia
- Courtenay-Comox-Powell River, British Columbia
- Cranbrook, British Columbia
- Dryden, Ontario
- Fort McMurray, Alberta
- Fort St. John, British Columbia
- Kamloops, British Columbia
- Kelowna, British Columbia
- Kenora, Ontario
- Lethbridge, Alberta
- Medicine Hat, Alberta
- Moose Jaw, Saskatchewan
- Nanaimo, British Columbia
- Port Alberni, British Columbia
- Prince Albert, Saskatchewan
- Prince George, British Columbia
- Red Deer, Alberta
- Saskatoon, Saskatchewan
- Sault Ste. Marie, Ontario
- Squamish/Whistler, British Columbia
- Thompson, Manitoba
- Thunder Bay, Ontario
- Victoria, British Columbia
- Winnipeg, Manitoba

== Community-specific programming ==
=== Alberta ===
==== Lethbridge ====
- go! Southern Alberta - News and information about events and activities in Southern Alberta.
- Live sports including WHL Hockey and Canada West University Football until 2016-17.
- farm.tv - agricultural events in Southern Alberta.
- SACPA - Southern Alberta Council on Public Affairs.
- A Public Education - stories from the Public Education Board and Schools in South Western Alberta.

=== British Columbia ===
==== Cranbrook/Castlegar ====
- Shaw TV – Daily programming rotation that focuses on local community events and issues.
- go! Kootenays - News and information about events and activities in the West and East Kootenays.
- Ice Chips - informnation about Kooteany Ice
- Russian programming (West Kootenay viewing area)
- Live sports including WHL Hockey and Canada West University Football until 2016-17.
- Cranbrook City Council - Tape coverage of local City Council meetings.
- Sparwood City Council - - Tape coverage of local City Council meetings.
- Castlegar City Council - Tape coverage of local City Council meetings.
- Nelson City Council - Tape coverage of local City Council meetings.
- Trail City Council - Tape coverage of local City Council meetings.
- Grand Forks City Council - Tape coverage of local City Council meetings.

==== Kamloops ====
- go! Kamloops - News and information about events and activities in Kamloops.
- Live sports including WHL Hockey and Canada West University Football until 2016-17.

==== Kelowna ====
- go! Okanagan - News and information about events and activities in Kelowna.
- Live sports including WHL Hockey and Canada West University Football until 2016-17.
- Kelowna City Council - Taped coverage of local City Council meetings.
- Lake Country City Council - Taped coverage of local City Council meetings.
- Peachland City Council - Taped coverage of local City Council meetings.
- Penticton City Council - Taped coverage of local City Council meetings.
- Vernon City Council - Taped coverage of local City Council meetings.

==== Nanaimo ====
Shaw Cable also operates a separate channel for the residents in Nanaimo, British Columbia, also on channel 4. Nanaimo's Shaw TV content contains programming from Port Alberni, Comox Valley, Cowichan Valley, Campbell River, Powell River and Victoria who all also produce their own programming.

==== Victoria ====
- Shaw TV South Vancouver Island can be found on channel 4 for Shaw Cable subscribers. It is available from Saltair to Victoria and on some of the Southern Gulf Islands.
- Shaw's program go! Island (formerly The Daily) was a long-running news magazine in Victoria. The show aired everyday on Channel 4 at 6pm. The show ended in early October 2016.
- Voice of BC with Vaughn Palmer. The show airs every Thursdays at 7 PM

=== Manitoba ===
==== Thompson ====
go! Thompson - Daily programming rotation that focuses on local community events and issues City Council, Norman Northstars Games, City Beat, Northstars Show, Rec 411, School Board, High School Sports

=== Ontario ===
==== Hamilton ====
Although Shaw provides cable service in parts of the Hamilton market, regional monopolies in the region are also held by Cogeco and Source Cable. The three companies jointly operate a single community channel for Hamilton known as Cable 14, so there is no Shaw TV channel proper in the region.

==== Kenora ====
In addition to Shaw Spotlight Kenora, Shaw Cablesystems also owned and operated CJBN-TV, a Global station in Kenora.

==== Sault Ste. Marie ====
- Sault Ste. Marie City Council – Live or taped coverage of local City Council meetings every 2nd Monday.
- OHL Hockey – Live coverage of Soo Greyhounds hockey. Both home (Produced by Shaw Cable live from the Essar Centre) and away games (Produced by either Rogers or Cogeco).
- The Northview – Wilderness scenes and sounds from throughout the Northern Ontario/Lake Superior region (Tourism information about the Sault and Algoma).
- go! Sault Ste. Marie – News and information about events and activities in Sault Ste. Marie.
- Shaw TV Messages – Message rotation that focuses on local community events.
- TAMI - Weekly local soap opera

=== Saskatchewan ===
==== Prince Albert ====
- Prince Albert City Council – Live and taped coverage of local City Council meetings.
- Timberline Music Show - Canadian singer songwriters perform original country music, hosted by Larry Krause
- Lit Happens - Local showcase of the literary talent of Prince Albert

==== Saskatoon ====
Branded as Telecable Ten from 1978 until the late 1980s, the station offered much the same programming as today's Shaw TV, with the exception of greater coverage of local events (including complete Saskatoon Exhibition entertainment performances) and volunteer-made TV series and talk shows. On-air personnel on Shaw TV Saskatoon has included numerous former newscasters and hosts from CFQC-TV.

- The Community Producers - A daily programming block with local stories and features produced by volunteers and community groups.
- Connect - A weekly interview show exploring topics and issues relevant to the community, hosted by Randy Pshebylo
- Cooked! With Shack - Cooking show hosted by Shack, a local radio personality
- Lit Happens - A weekly show focusing on the literary arts scene in Saskatchewan, hosted by local storyteller Danica Lorer
- Punch TV - The best of Saskatchewan's artists, writers, and other creative types who love comics, anime, pop culture and more
- Saskatoon City Council – Live broadcast of local city council meetings.
- Live sports including high school sports and other local tournaments such as the annual Bedford Road Invitational Tournament
- Other long-running special event coverage such as the Saskatoon Exhibition Parade and local Remembrance Day services

==== Moose Jaw ====
- Moose Jaw This Week - Long-running weekly local talk/interview show, hosted by Lyle Johnson

== Sports ==
Shaw TV provides local sports coverage. It provided live network sports coverage until the end of the 2016-17 Western Hockey League season.

In terms of network coverage, Shaw was in a partnership with the Western Hockey League from 2003-04 through 2016-17 to all subscribers across the network in Western Canada known as WHL on SHAW. The schedule usually consisted of random games before the December holiday break, with a regular game of the week on Friday nights plus select Saturday and mid week games.

In the playoffs, Shaw will select one series per round to cover. Play-by-play broadcasters for the 2012–13 season include Dan Russell and Peter Loubardias. Russell is in his ninth year as play-by-play announcer. Bill Wilms and Jeff Odgers provide colour commentary, with Andy Neal responsible for hosting duties.

In 2006, Shaw added Canada West Football as a sports property with a game of the week package known as Krown Produce Canada West Football on Shaw. Shaw carried the Hardy Cup Championship until 2011, when the conference elected to broadcast the game on TSN. The Hardy returned to Shaw from 2013 - 2016. The Shaw TV production produced and presented the Hardy to 10.2 million households in the 2015 season on Global TV nationally.

Jim Mullin was responsible for the play-by-play broadcast duties from 2006 until the series end in 2016. Colour announcers included former Saskatchewan Huskies quarterback Laurence Nixon, former Hec Crighton Trophy winner and Canadian Football League running back Jesse Lumsden, Saskatoon-based broadcaster Wray Morrison, Krown Countdown U analyst Gord Randall and former CFL player Daved Benefield. Andy Neal handled the hosting duties. It was announced before the start of the 2012 season that Canada West had renewed their agreement with Shaw for another three seasons.

In 2009, Shaw broadcast provincial curling championships for men and women in Manitoba, Alberta and British Columbia. In 2013, Rogers Sportsnet obtained the rights for Manitoba's and Alberta's playdowns. It was announced by Curl BC prior to Shaw's coverage in 2013 that the broadcast rights for BC will move to Sportsnet for 2014.

In 2012, Shaw broadcast the CIS Final Eight Women's Basketball Championship a.k.a. The Bronze Baby from the University of Calgary and shared the feed with NBA TV Canada.

All of Shaw TV's network sports coverage ceased with the CRTC-approved closure of the Shaw TV channels in Calgary, Edmonton, Alberta and Vancouver, British Columbia, and the renaming to Shaw Spotlight.

== Controversies ==
Some concern has been raised about the company putting business interests over public-access/community interests, and has led one community group to consider creating an alternative, independent local public-access service in Vancouver.
