= John Metchie III =

Canadian football player (born 2000)

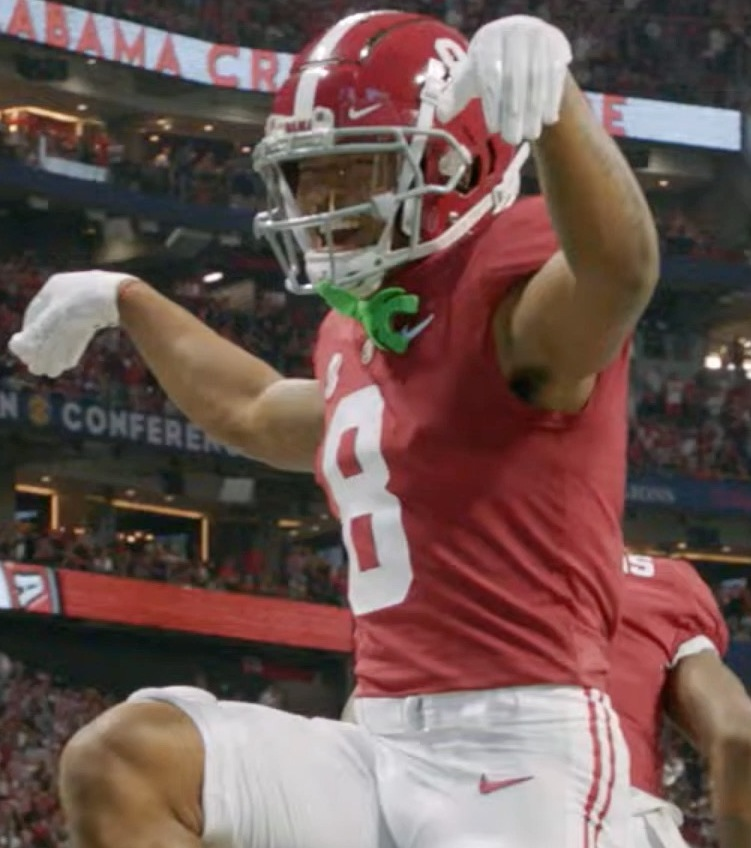
- Metchie with the Alabama Crimson Tide in 2021

No. 13 – Carolina Panthers
- Positions: Wide receiver, return specialist
- Roster status: Active

Personal information
- Born: July 18, 2000 (age 26); Taipei, Taiwan
- Listed height: 5 ft 11 in (1.80 m)
- Listed weight: 204 lb (93 kg)

Career information
- High school: St. James (Hagerstown, Maryland, U.S.); Peddie (Hightstown, New Jersey, U.S.)
- College: Alabama (2019–2021)
- NFL draft: 2022: 2nd round, 44th overall pick
- CFL draft: 2022: 7th round, 59th overall pick

Career history
- Houston Texans (2022–2024); Philadelphia Eagles (2025); New York Jets (2025); Carolina Panthers (2026–present)

Awards and highlights
- George Halas Award (2024); CFP national champion (2020); 2× Jon Cornish Trophy (2020, 2021); Second-team All-SEC (2021)

Career NFL statistics as of Week 4, 2026
- Receptions: 78
- Receiving yards: 742
- Rushing yards: -1
- Return yards: 173
- Receiving touchdowns: 4
- Stats at Pro Football Reference

John Metchie III (/mɛˈtʃiːeɪ/ MET-chee-ay; born July 18, 2000) is a Taiwanese-Canadian professional football wide receiver and return specialist for the Carolina Panthers of the National Football League (NFL). He played college football for the Alabama Crimson Tide, winning the Jon Cornish Trophy twice prior to being selected by the Texans in the second round of the 2022 NFL draft. Metchie sat out his rookie season after being diagnosed with acute promyelocytic leukemia and returned to play in 2023.

== Early life ==
Metchie was born in Taiwan to a Nigerian father and Taiwanese mother on July 18, 2000. His family moved to Accra, Ghana, when he was one before moving to Brampton, Ontario, Canada, with his mother and four brothers while his father remained in Ghana. He then moved to the United States to attend St. James School in Hagerstown, Maryland. Metchie spent a post-graduate year at the Peddie School in Hightstown, New Jersey, before committing to play college football at the University of Alabama.

== College career ==
Metchie played in all 13 games as a freshman at Alabama in 2019 and had four catches for 23 yards. He became one of Alabama's top three receivers his sophomore year in 2020 racking up 916 yards on 55 receptions with six touchdowns. He was the first receiver to win the Jon Cornish Trophy as the top Canadian in NCAA football in the 2020 season. As a junior in 2021, Metchie recorded 96 receptions for 1,142 yards and eight touchdowns before tearing his ACL in the 2021 SEC Championship Game. Metchie was again named the recipient of the Jon Cornish Trophy, joining Nathan Rourke as the only two-time winners.

== Professional career ==
Pre-draft measurables
Height	Weight	Arm length	Hand span	Wingspan
5 ft 11 1/4 in (1.81 m)	187 lb (85 kg)	30 5/8 in (0.78 m)	9 1/4 in (0.23 m)	6 ft 1 3/8 in (1.86 m)
All values from NFL Combine

=== Houston Texans ===
Metchie was selected by the Houston Texans in the second round (44th overall) of the 2022 NFL draft. He was also selected by the BC Lions in the seventh round (59th overall) of the 2022 CFL draft before signing a four-year contract, worth $8 million, with the Texans on May 14, 2022. In July, Metchie announced he would sit out his rookie season after being diagnosed with acute promyelocytic leukemia.

A year after receiving his diagnosis, Metchie was cleared to attend training camp. He played his first career NFL game in Week 2 against the Indianapolis Colts and finished the 2023 season with 16 receptions for 158 yards. At the end of the 2024 season, Metchie was named the Texans recipient of the Ed Block Courage award for overcoming his leukemia diagnosis. Metchie was named the recipient of the 2024 George Halas Award by the Pro Football Writers of America for overcoming the most adversity and succeeding. In Week 10 of the 2024 season, he scored his first professional touchdown against the Detroit Lions. In the 2024 season, Metchie finished with 24 reception for 254 yards and one touchdown.

=== Philadelphia Eagles ===
On August 18, 2025, Metchie and a 2026 sixth-round pick were traded to the Philadelphia Eagles in exchange for Harrison Bryant and a 2026 fifth-round pick. He made seven appearances for Philadelphia, recording four receptions for 18 scoreless yards.

=== New York Jets ===
On October 29, 2025, Metchie and a 2027 sixth-round pick were traded to the New York Jets in exchange for Michael Carter II and a 2027 seventh-round pick. He finished the 2025 season with 33 receptions for 274 yards and two touchdowns.

=== Carolina Panthers ===
On March 11, 2026, Metchie signed a one-year, $1.9 million contract with the Carolina Panthers.

== Career statistics ==
=== NFL ===
==== Regular season ====
Year	Team	Games		Receiving					Rushing					Fumbles	
Year	Team	GP	GS	Rec	Yds	Avg	Lng	TD	Att	Yds	Avg	Lng	TD	Fum	Lost
2022	HOU	0	0	DNP											
2023	HOU	16	0	16	158	9.9	22	0	1	4	4.0	4	0	0	0
2024	HOU	13	0	24	254	10.6	28	1	0	0	0	0	0	1	0
2025	PHI	7	0	4	18	4.5	8	0	0	0	0	0	0	0	0
2025	NYJ	9	7	29	256	8.8	22	2	3	-5	-1.7	4	0	0	0
2026	CAR	3	0	5	56	11.2	18	1	0	0	0	0	0	0	0
Career		47	10	75	705	9.4	28	4	4	-1	-0.3	4	0	1	0

==== Postseason ====
Year	Team	Games		Receiving					Rushing					Fumbles	
Year	Team	GP	GS	Rec	Yds	Avg	Lng	TD	Att	Yds	Avg	Lng	TD	Fum	Lost
2023	HOU	2	0	3	44	14.7	27	0	1	9	9.0	9	0	0	0
2024	HOU	2	0	6	63	10.5	24	0	0	0	0	0	0	0	0
Career		4	0	9	107	11.89	27	0	1	9	9.0	9	0	0	0

=== College ===
College statistics
Season	GP	Receiving				
Season	GP	Rec	Yds	Avg	Lng	TD
2019	4	4	23	5.8	17	0
2020	13	55	916	16.7	78	6
2021	13	96	1,142	11.9	46	8
Career	30	155	2,081	13.4	78	14

== Personal life ==
His older brother, Royce Metchie, is a defensive back for the Edmonton Elks of the Canadian Football League.
