= Saint Stephen's Episcopal School (Bradenton, Florida) =

American preparatory school

Location
- 315 41st Street West, Bradenton, FL 34209; Bradenton, Florida 34209; United States; 27.4970°N 82.6005°W

Information
- School type: Private College Preparatory
- Motto: Caelum mihi sedes est (Latin) (Motto in English: "Heaven is my seat")
- Denomination: Episcopal
- Established: 1970
- Head of School: Peter Kraft
- Grades: Pre-Kindergarten to 12
- Gender: Coeducational
- Enrollment: 650
- Average class size: 15
- Student to teacher ratio: 9:1
- Campus size: 35-acre campus
- Colours: Green and gold
- Athletics: Football, Soccer, Basketball, Golf, Crew, Volleyball, Softball, Baseball, Cheerleading, Cross Country, Track and Field, Tennis, Lacrosse
- Mascot: Freddy Falcon
- Accreditation: FCIS, NAES
- Newspaper: The Gauntlet
- Website: http://www.saintstephens.org/

Saint Stephen's Episcopal School is a private college preparatory school affiliated with the Episcopal Church. The school is accredited by the Florida Council of Independent Schools. It is located in Bradenton, Florida. Founded in 1970, SSES has 650 students in grades Pre-K3 through 12.

== History ==
In 1970, a group of community leaders met with Christ Episcopal Church to propose the establishment of a school dedicated to maintaining high academic standards and offering small class sizes. This materialized as Saint Stephen's Episcopal School, which saw its first class of 11 seniors graduate in 1975.

Today, Saint Stephen's Episcopal School, or SSES, has a 35-acre campus and serves Pre-K through 12th grade. SSES has also achieved State Championships in a multitude of sports on 20 different occasions.

== Notable alumni ==
- Chase Brown, professional football player for the Cincinnati Bengals
- Sydney Brown, professional football player for the Philadelphia Eagles
- Ryan Roslansky, CEO of LinkedIn
- Jim Courier, Class of 87', professional tennis player.
- Brad Rusin, Class of 05', Retired professional soccer player.
