= Jim Mullin =

Canadian sports journalist, broadcaster

- Born: North Vancouver, British Columbia, Canada
- Occupations: Sports executive, broadcaster, and producer
- Employer: N8 Group
- Known for: Vice President, IFAF, President, Football Canada, Krown Countdown U, Krown Gridiron Nation on TSN, Gridiron Nation on Game+, Canada West Football on SHAW

Jim Mullin is a Vancouver-based broadcaster, producer and promoter. On 7 December 2024 he was elected Vice President of IFAF to a four-year term, after previously serving as General Secretary of IFAF. He is also the commissioner of the Gridiron Nations Championship. On 25 February 2025, he was named Chair of the IFAF Global Tackle Football Task Force with a mission to reorganise international competition.

He is one of the two patrons of the Jon Cornish Trophy, presented annually to the top Canadian in NCAA Football.

After serving on the Football Canada board of directors beginning in 2016 in June 2019, he was elected as President of Football Canada, the governing body for gridiron football at the amateur level. He was re-elected to the position for a second term in June 2022, and left the post prior to declaring his candidacy for the IFAF Vice President's role in October 2024.

He is the producer and host of Krown Gridiron Nation on The Sports Network. He also hosted and produced Krown Countdown U Radio on the TSN Radio Network. He was the play-by-play voice for SHAW TV/Global TV for 10 years from 2007 to 2016. He was the play-by-play voice of the IFAF World Junior Football tournament in Mexico carried on CBC Sports in 2018.

He was one of the project partners behind the proposed Northern 8 football series, which would have scheduled the eight top Canadian university football teams in a series of games for national television.

He was the Vancouver Director of the 47th Vanier Cup, played at BC Place Stadium November 25, 2011. He also provided the play-by-play of the game on TSN Radio on TEAM 1410, with network stations in Montreal TSN 990 and Hamilton CHML 900.

He previously worked with CKNW radio as their sports director before resigning in May 2011. He is the last of a long line of sports directors at the station which included J.P. McConnell, Dave Hodge, Al Davidson and Bill Good Sr. CKNW discontinued the role of sports director in July 2011.

He is also an international broadcaster, writer and documentary features producer.

He has called play-by-play of over 550 games in football, basketball, hockey, curling, badminton, equestrian and lacrosse. He was a play-by-play announcer for SHAW TV in Western Canada for University football, Western Hockey League games and Provincial Curling in BC. He called his 100th university football game September 24, 2010 when the Regina Rams faced the UBC Thunderbirds at Thunderbird Stadium. He was the "WHL Insider" on the WHL on SHAW. He has played a role supporting amateur sports in BC. He has called 14 Shrum Bowl games since 1990 on either TV or radio.

He was the vice-president (university) of the Football Reporters of Canada. He reformed and was responsible for coordinating the weekly national FRC-CIS Football Top 10 media/coaches poll for university football in Canada. He founded the University Football Reporters of Canada in 2008. The UFRC was merged with the FRC in November 2009.

He also serves as chair of the Amateur Sub-committee for the Canadian Football Hall of Fame, and serves as the British Columbia representative for the CFHOF. He has also served on the Board of Directors of Football Canada since 2015.

He has worked in five continents and his voice was heard around the world by basketball fans from 1994 to 1997 as the English play-by-play commentator for FIBA, the world governing body of basketball. Based in London, England he also hosted and co-produced "FIBA SLAM" a weekly magazine show on Eurosport and ESPN International. Some of his play-by-play was used in an ESPN 30 for 30 "Once Brothers", telling the story of Yugoslavian and Croatian basketball during the 1990s.

He was the radio play-by-play voice of two (2004, 2006) Canadian Interuniversity Sport (CIS) national basketball championships in Halifax on radio in Vancouver and Victoria.

In hockey, he was the play-by-play voice of the Western Hockey League's Vancouver Giants, Victoria Cougars, New Westminster Bruins and the BCHL Bellingham Ice Hawks.
