= Northern 8 =

Northern Football Series
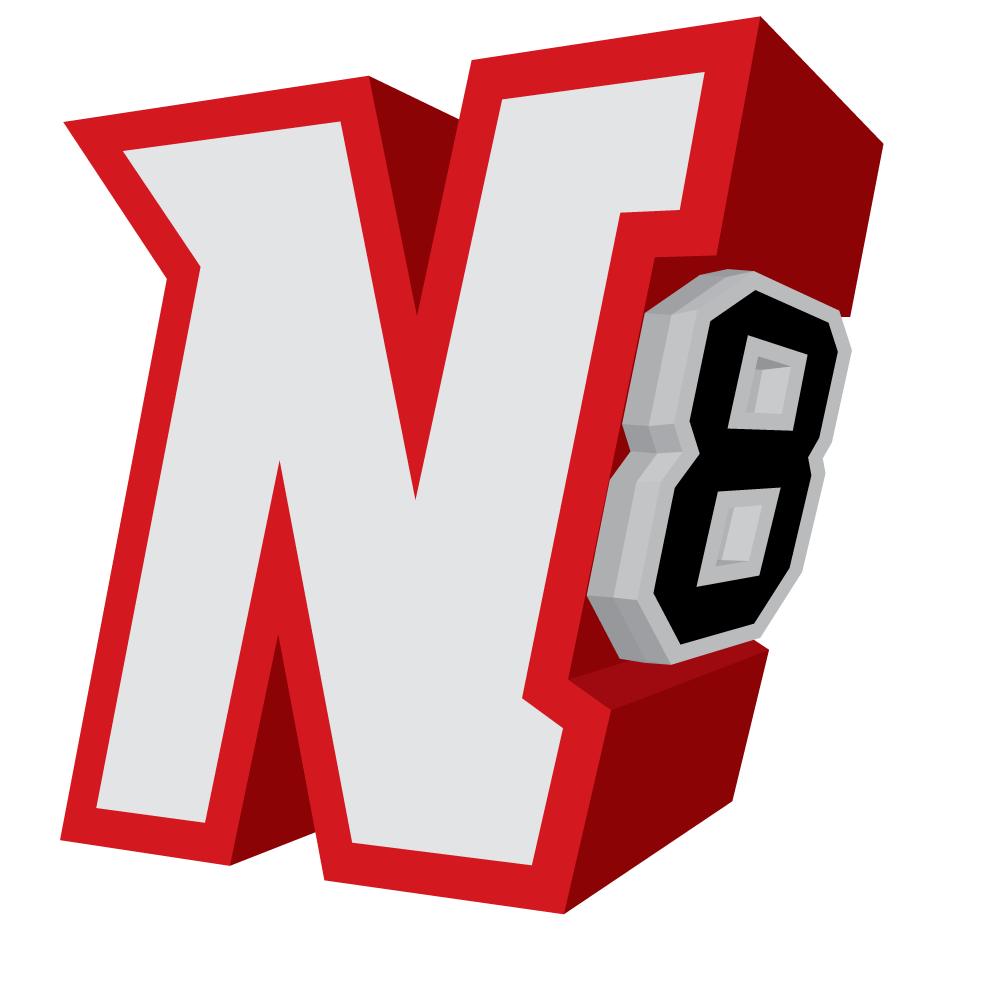
- Conference: U Sports (then known as CIS)
- Sports fielded: Football
- Headquarters: Saskatoon, Vancouver
- Region: Canada

The Northern Football Series (a.k.a. Northern 8) was a proposed sub-conference and competition for Canadian university football teams which was submitted to all Canadian university football schools on January 5, 2015. It would potentially involve the top two teams from the CWUAA, which covers Western Canada, four teams from the Ontario University Athletics (OUA), and the top two teams from the Quebec Student Sport Federation (RSEQ). A team from Atlantic University Sport (AUS) could qualify in the second year of operation.

The series would have been managed as a football-only conference by U Sports, then known as Canadian Interuniversity Sport (CIS), which would provide direct oversight.

== Business model ==
The Northern Football Series was a creation of Saskatoon-based businessman L. David Dube and Vancouver-based broadcaster Jim Mullin. The objective was to create a televised game of the week for Canadian university football to expand and grow the game in Canada. The proposed model was a non-profit business with Dube investing the full-cost of television production and administrative functions. Participating schools would split the cost of air travel equally between participants.

The investors in the conference would have held 51 per cent of the vote on a board of directors, with the other four conferences possessing a vote proportional to the number of teams they have competing in U Sports football.

Any profits from the operation of the conference would have been redistributed to non-participating teams.

== Competition ==
The first season would have featured two draws of four teams each side.

| Draw one | Projected Team | Draw two | Projected Team |
|---|---|---|---|
| RSEQ 1 | Laval Rouge et Or | OUA 1 | McMaster Marauders |
| CWUAA 1 | Calgary Dinos | OUA 2 | Guelph Gryphons |
| RSEQ 2 | Montreal Carabins | OUA 3 | Western Mustangs |
| CWUAA 2 | Manitoba Bisons or Saskatchewan Huskies | OUA 4 | Ottawa Gee Gees |

The following games would count in a Northern 8 standing, and in the regular season standing of the team in their native conference. The schedule would be as follows:

| RSEQ 1 | at | OUA 1 |
| OUA 1 | at | CWUAA 1 |
| CWUAA 1 | at | OUA 2 |
| OUA 2 | at | RSEQ 1 |
| RSEQ 2 | at | OUA 3 |
| OUA 3 | at | CWUAA 2 |
| CWUAA 2 | at | OUA 4 |
| OUA 4 | at | RSEQ 2 |

There is a provision for an additional two non-conference games to complete the competition cycle. These games would not count in conference standings for the Canada West or RSEQ but they would count within a Northern 8 standing. These games would be played before the start of the regular season of CIS Football:

| RSEQ 1 | v. | CWUAA 1 |
| CWUAA 2 | v. | RSEQ 2 |

Games played in-conference (Canada West, OUA, RSEQ) against common opponents would create a five-game sub-conference standing for the Northern 8. For example:

| OUA 1 | v. | RSEQ 1 | (Northern 8 game) |
| OUA 1 | v. | CW 1 | (Northern 8 game) |
| OUA 1 | v. | OUA 2 | (OUA regular season game, versus common Northern 8 participant) |
| OUA 1 | v. | OUA 3 | (OUA regular season game, versus common Northern 8 participant) |
| OUA 1 | v. | OUA 4 | (OUA regular season game, versus common Northern 8 participant) |

=== Selection of teams ===
Teams would have been selected in cooperation with all stakeholders. The primary means of selection of a team will be based on the previous season's regular season record. However, other variables would be factored into selection. There would be annual promotion and relegation from the series.

=== Parity and non-competing teams ===
Teams which do not participate in Northern 8 will have a parity adjusted schedule. Teams that are developing programs would face other teams at a similar level more often in their conference play, while facing Northern 8 teams fewer times.

Coupled with the existing AUS-RSEQ interlock, the competition also provided the tools for a national ratings percentage index (RPI) for all 27 teams by the end of the season.

=== Play off and championships ===
The champion of the Northern 8 would have been determined by the standings and not a championship game.

The structure of the competition is such that it maintained the current championship formats for the four main conferences, and the national playoff system for the CIS.

== First attempt (2014–2015) ==
The CWUAA approved the Northern 8 proposal in principle at their winter football meetings February 2, 2015. The RSEQ requested that the applicants reconsider their bid for 2016 after a vote at their winter meetings in January. The OUA has stated in media reports that they have rejected the proposal. OUA CEO Gord Grace told TSN, "It's impossible. We've already approved our schedule. We have to get on with things."

The OUA did not invite the Northern 8 group to make a presentation at their winter football meetings. The AUS has stated that they would direct all efforts toward a CIS Football task force which was formed in February 2015 to address issues associated with the management of the game.

Football Canada, the governing body for the sport in Canada approved the plan in March 2015, although their decision does not have a direct impact on the execution of the proposal.

There was national media coverage of the proposal across the country. Opinion columns on the proposal were generally favourable. Morris Dalla Costa of the London Free Press wrote;

"The pressure will mount on those in the OUA who are resisting. It will increase because the interlocking idea is a good one and is needed to give university football in this country at least a chance of garnering more interest and profile.An interlocking schedule would be accompanied by nationally televised games, games that a private sponsor has already committed to paying for. How’s that not a good thing?"

== Second attempt (2016–2017) ==
Le Journal de Québec reported in December 2016 that the RSEQ was again interested in interlocking play with the Canada West. Laval athletic director and RSEQ football chairperson Christian Gagnon indicated the conference was ready to talk to the N8 Group again along with the Canada West. "We have to sit down, the four regions, and look at the portrait on a Canadian scale," Gagnon told JDQ. "We must also talk with David Dube and Jim Mullin who had launched a project of a national calendar last year."

Dube and Mullin's N8 Group, working with Canada West proposed an eight team home-and-home competition featuring the top four teams from the RSEQ playing the top four teams from Canada West, along with the bottom two teams from Canada West playing the bottom one or two teams from RSEQ. At the USPORTS AGM in June 2017 in Toronto, N8 and Canada West offered a three-month window to work through the details of the plan, but the offer was rejected. The RSEQ reversed their position citing they did not want to work with a third party to deliver games to television in English Canada.
